= Ayen =

- Commune
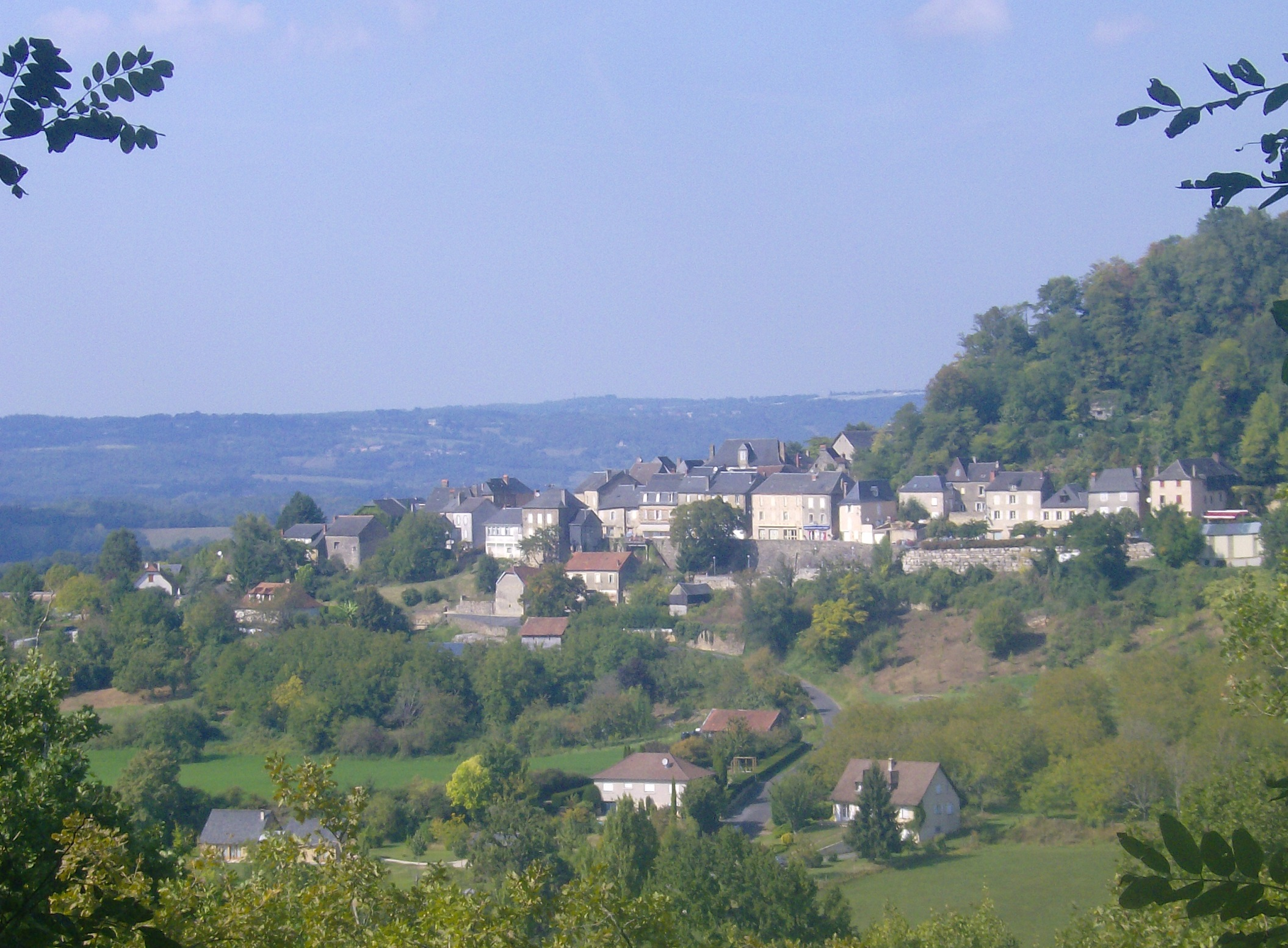
- Ayen Village

- Coat of arms
- Location of Ayen
- Location within France Location within Nouvelle-Aquitaine
- Coordinates: 45°14′52″N 1°19′38″E
- Country: France
- Region: Nouvelle-Aquitaine
- Department: Corrèze
- Arrondissement: Brive-la-Gaillarde
- Canton: L'Yssandonnais
- Intercommunality: CA Bassin Brive

Government
  - Mayor (2020–2026): Hélène Lacroix
- Area^{1}: 13.16 km^{2} (5.08 sq mi)
- Elevation: 320 m (1,050 ft)
- Highest elevation: 379 m (1,243 ft)
- Lowest elevation: 123 m (404 ft)
- Population (2023): 717
  - Density: 54.5/km^{2} (141/sq mi)
- Time zone: UTC+01:00 (CET)
  - Summer (DST): UTC+02:00 (CEST)
- INSEE/Postal code: 19015 /19310
- ^{1} French Land Register data, which excludes lakes, ponds, glaciers > 1 km^{2} (0.386 sq mi or 247 acres) and river estuaries.

Ayen is a commune in the Corrèze department in the Nouvelle-Aquitaine region of central France.

The commune has been awarded two flowers by the National Council of Towns and Villages in Bloom in the Competition of cities and villages in Bloom.

== Geography ==
Ayen is located some 20 km north-west of Brive-la-Gaillarde and 7 km west of Objat. Access to the commune is by road D5 from Saint-Robert in the west which passes through the village and continues south-east to join the D901. The D39 comes from Perpezac-le-Blanc in the south and passes through the village before continuing north to Juillac. The D17 from Rosiers-de-Juillac in the north-west passes through the north of the commune and continues south-west to join the D901. The D95 goes south-west from the village to Louignac and the D2 goes south to Cublac. The D140 goes north-east from the village to Vars-sur-Roseix. Apart from the village there are the hamlets of Ayen Bas to the west of the village; Laval, Soulet, and Leyfourchie in the north of the commune; and Graschamp, Le Temple, Les Chaumonts, and Les Charnie in the south. The commune is mixed forest and farmland.

The Roseix river forms the northern border of the commune as it flows east by south-east to join the Loyre south of Objat. The Elle rises in the south of the commune and flows west then south forming the western border before it continues south to join the Corrèze west of Terrasson-Lavilledieu. Other unnamed streams rise in the commune and flow northwards to join the Roseix.

== History ==
Ayen is a former county which was created as a duchy in February 1737 for Louis de Noailles.

One of the largest commanderies of the Knights of Malta in the region was in the commune at the Temple of Ayen.

In 1137 Ayen, as with all of Aquitaine, joined the kingdom of France through the marriage of Eleanor and Louis VII but, after the divorce from Eleanor, it came under English rule.

After two turbulent centuries during which the Limousin barons indulged in incessant wars, the English reoccupied Malemort and Ayen whose chateau was occupied notably by Richard the Lion Heart.

In 1415 the Brivistes (Note: Inhabitants of Brive-la-Gaillarde) supported by King Charles VI destroyed the Chateau of Malemort. The English survivors took refuge in the chateau at Ayen. The following year the peasants of the village laid siege to the chateau. After 17 days of blockade, overcome by hunger and thirst, the English surrendered. To prevent the fortress from falling into the hands of their enemies Jean I of Comborn, future chamberlain of Charles VII, received the mission to raze the Chateau of Ayen.

Ayen was one of the stages of a route from Segur which was known by Richard the Lion-Heart. There are still remnants of the passage of his troops through Pompadour, Juillac, Ayen, and Noailles. Richard ended his life killed at the Siege of Chalus in 1199.

=== Heraldry ===
Arms of Ayen	Blazon: Tierced per fesse, at 1 Gules, a cross Argent; at 2 Azure with 3 flurs-de-lys 2 and 1; at 3 Gules a bend of Or.

== Administration ==
List of Successive Mayors

From	To	Name
2001	2014	Paul Reynal
2014	2026	Hélène Lacroix

== Demography ==
The inhabitants of the commune are known as Ayennois or Ayennoises in French.

Historical population

Year	Pop.	±% p.a.
1793	947	—
1800	935	−0.18%
1806	978	+0.75%
1821	958	−0.14%
1831	974	+0.17%
1836	1,007	+0.67%
1841	1,198	+3.53%
1846	1,263	+1.06%
1851	1,269	+0.09%
1856	1,366	+1.48%
1861	1,326	−0.59%
1866	1,333	+0.11%
1872	1,326	−0.09%
1876	1,330	+0.08%
1881	1,290	−0.61%
1886	1,247	−0.68%
1891	1,136	−1.85%
1896	1,185	+0.85%
1901	1,194	+0.15%

Year	Pop.	±% p.a.
1906	1,240	+0.76%
1911	1,242	+0.03%
1921	1,010	−2.05%
1926	967	−0.87%
1931	930	−0.78%
1936	906	−0.52%
1946	867	−0.44%
1954	847	−0.29%
1962	761	−1.33%
1968	733	−0.62%
1975	654	−1.62%
1982	704	+1.06%
1990	682	−0.40%
1999	623	−1.00%
2007	694	+1.36%
2012	724	+0.85%
2017	714	−0.28%
2023	717	+0.07%

Source: EHESS and INSEE

== Culture and heritage ==
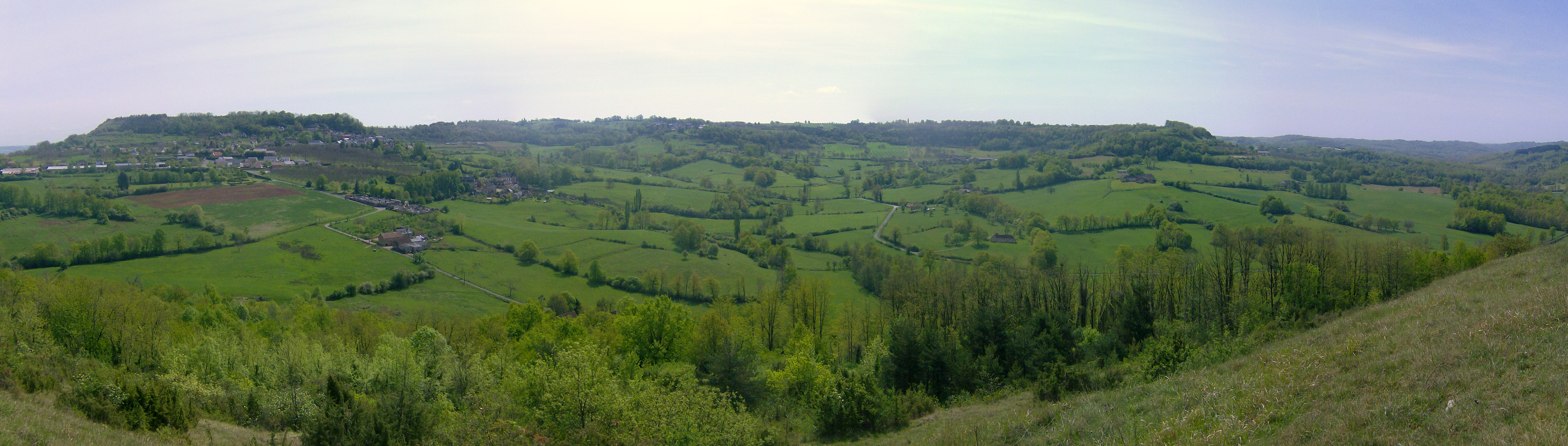
View from the Puy Guimont.

=== Civil heritage ===
- The panoramic view from the ramparts of Upper Ayen.
- The old village at Bas Ayen
- The Fountain called L'Homme qui crache

=== Religious heritage ===
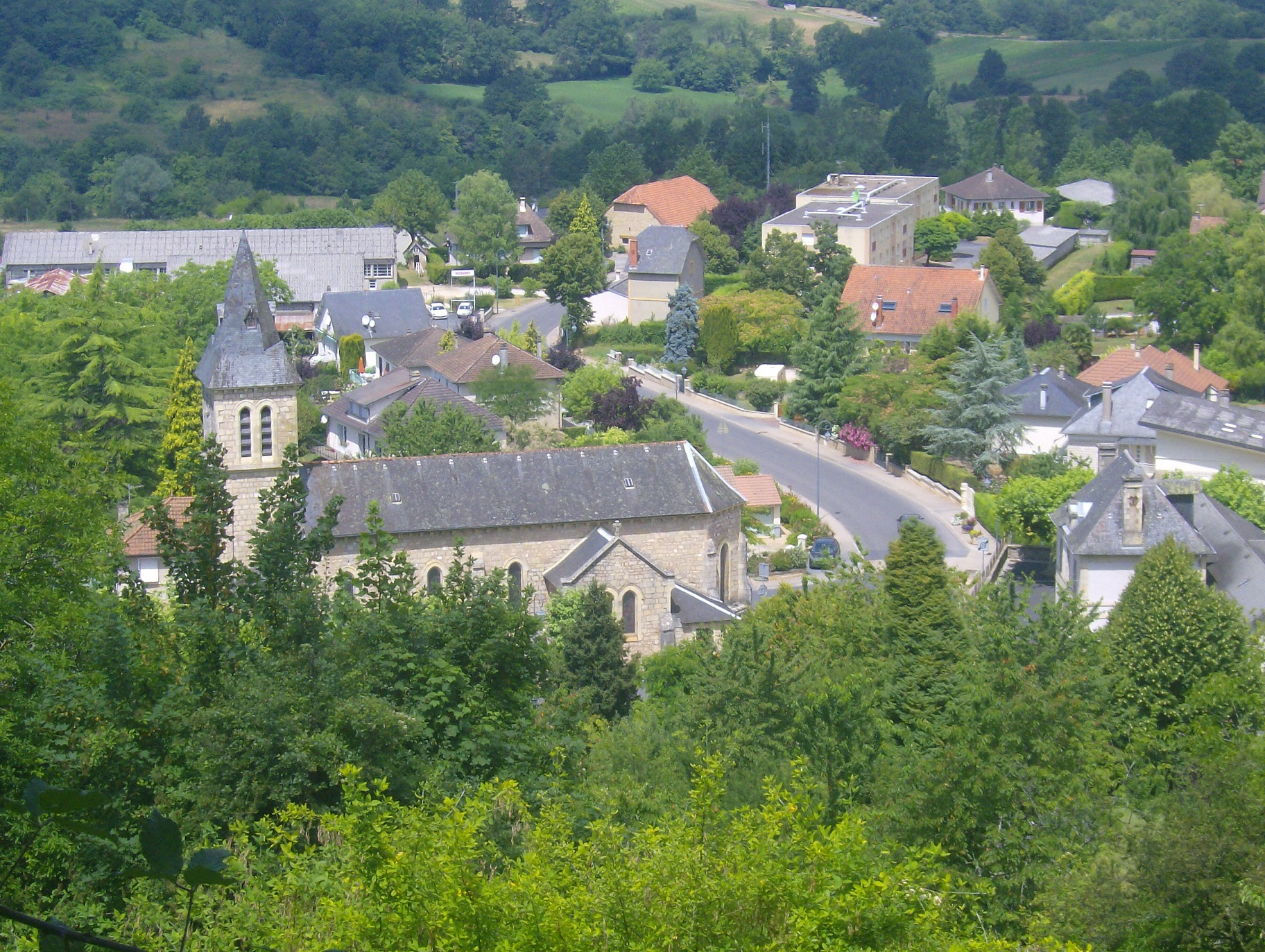
The Parish Church of Saint Madeleine

The Parish Church of Saint Madeleine contains many items that are registered as historical objects:

- 33 door hinges and 2 door handles (14th century)
- A set of 6 Tombs embedded in the walls (14th century)
- A Tomb embedded in the wall (14th century)
- A Tomb embedded in the wall (14th century)
- A Tomb embedded in the wall (14th century)
- A Tomb embedded in the wall (14th century)
- A Tomb embedded in the wall (14th century)
- A Tomb embedded in the wall (14th century)
- A Bronze Bell (1604)

The embedded tombs (enfeus in French) were reinstalled in the new church after the destruction of the old church in 1894.

== Sights ==
- Arboretum de la Tuillère

== See also ==
- Communes of the Corrèze department

=== Bibliography ===
- Ayen in Lower Limousin and Les Noailles during the Revolution, Maurice Cassan, 1989, R. Dessagne, 279 pages (in French)
- The Duchy of Ayen and Les Noailles, a land of Limousin, Maurice Cassan, 1987, R. Dessagne, 245 pages (in French)
- Short History of the Church of Ayen, Maurice Cassan, 1986 (in French)
