= Vignols =

- Commune
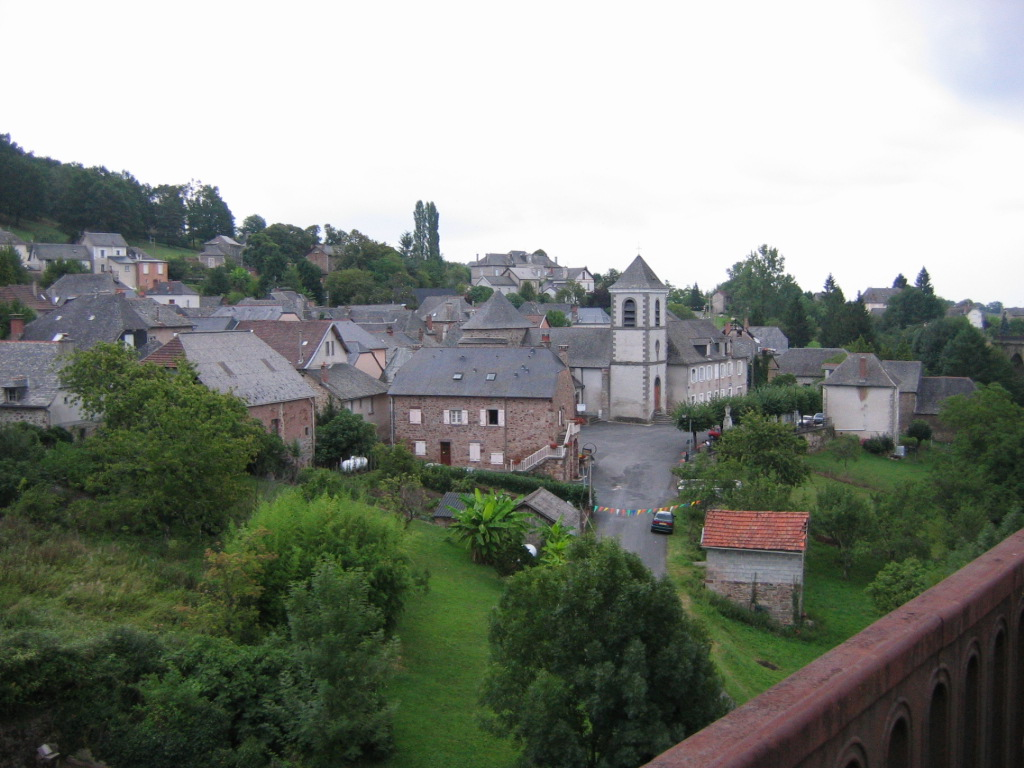
- The church and surrounding buildings in Vignols

- Coat of arms
- Location of Vignols
- Location within France Location within Nouvelle-Aquitaine
- Coordinates: 45°19′16″N 1°23′25″E
- Country: France
- Region: Nouvelle-Aquitaine
- Department: Corrèze
- Arrondissement: Brive-la-Gaillarde
- Canton: L'Yssandonnais
- Intercommunality: CA Bassin de Brive

Government
  - Mayor (2020–2026): Martine Souzy
- Area^{1}: 15.41 km^{2} (5.95 sq mi)
- Elevation: 237 m (778 ft)
- Highest elevation: 394 m (1,293 ft)
- Lowest elevation: 137 m (449 ft)
- Population (2023): 536
  - Density: 34.8/km^{2} (90.1/sq mi)
- Time zone: UTC+01:00 (CET)
  - Summer (DST): UTC+02:00 (CEST)
- INSEE/Postal code: 19286 /19130
- ^{1} French Land Register data, which excludes lakes, ponds, glaciers > 1 km^{2} (0.386 sq mi or 247 acres) and river estuaries.

Vignols (French pronunciation: [viɲɔl]; Occitan: Vinhòls) is a commune in the Corrèze department in central France.

== Geography ==
=== General ===
In the western half of the Corrèze department, on the northern edge of the Yssandonnais, the commune of Vignols extends over 15.41 km^{2}. It is bordered to the east for about four kilometres by the Loire, a tributary of the Vézère.

The minimum altitude, 137 metres, is located in the extreme south-west, north of the place called the Moulin de Champagne, where a tributary of the Mayenne stream leaves the commune and enters that of Saint-Solve. The maximum altitude of 394 metres is located in the north, at a place called Le Caillou.

At the intersection of departmental roads (RD) 9E2 and 31 and served by the railway line from Nexon to Brive-la-Gaillarde at Vignols - Saint-Solve station, the town of Vignols is located, in great circle distances, 18 kilometres south-west of Uzerche, and 21 kilometres north-west of Brive-la-Gaillarde. The commune is also served by the RD 31E3, 86 and 134.

=== Neighbouring municipalities ===
Vignols borders eight other communes. To the north, Saint-Sornin-Lavolps is only bordered for a little more than 200 metres and to the south-west, Saint-Cyr-la-Roche is bordered for an equivalent distance. To the west, the municipal territory is nearly 600 mètres.de that of Chabrignac.

=== Climate ===
Historically, the commune is exposed to an oceanic climate in Aquitaine. In 2020, Météo-France published a typology of the climates of metropolitan France in which the commune is exposed to an altered oceanic climate and is in the western and northwestern climatic region of the Massif Central, characterized by an annual rainfall of 900 to 1,500 mm, which mostly falls in autumn and winter.

For the 1971-2000 period, the averae annual temperature is 11.4 °C, with an annual temperature of 13.7 °C. The total average annual rainfall was 1,160 mm, with 13.8 days of precipitation in January and 7.3 days in July. For the 1991-2020 period, the average annual temperature observed at the nearest weather station, located in the municipality of Voutezac 5 km away as the crow flies, was 12.2°C and the average total annual precipitation was 1,014.2 mm. For the future, the municipality's climate parameters estimated for 2050 according to different greenhouse gas emission scenarios can be consulted on a dedicated website published by Météo-France in November 2022.

== Urban Planning ==
=== Typology ===
As of 1 January 2024, Vignols is categorised as a rural commune with dispersed housing, according to the new 7-level municipal density grid defined by INSEE in 2022. It is located outside the urban unit. In addition, the commune is part of the Brive-la-Gaillarde catchment area, of which it is a crown commune. This area, which includes 80 municipalities, is categorized as an area with 50,000 to less than 200,000 inhabitants.

=== Land Area ===
The land use of the municipality, as shown by the European biophysical land cover database Corine Land Cover (CLC), is marked by the importance of agricultural land (50.5% in 2018), a proportion roughly equivalent to that of 1990 (50.4%). The detailed breakdown in 2018 is as follows: forests (46.3%), heterogeneous agricultural areas (42.8%), permanent crops (4.3%), meadows (3.5%), urbanised areas (3.2%).

The evolution of the land use of the commune and its infrastructures can be observed on various cartographic representations of the territory: the Cassini map (eighteenth century), the staff map (1820-1866) and the IGN maps or aerial photos for the current period (1950 toNa today).

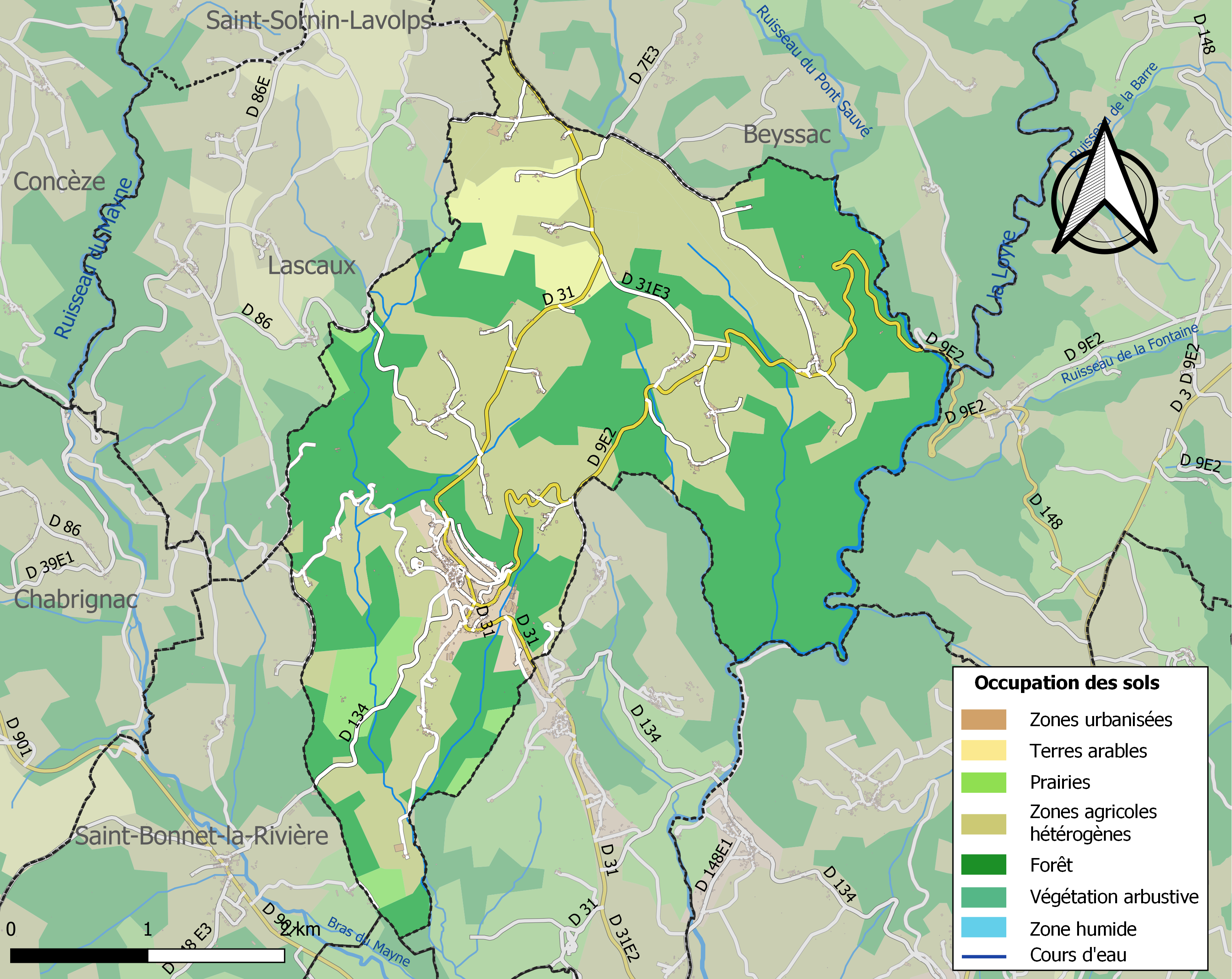
Map of the municipality's infrastructure and land use in 2018 (CLC).

=== Major risks ===
The territory of the municipality of Vignols is vulnerable to various natural hazards: meteorological events (storms, thunderstorms, snow, extreme cold, heat waves or drought), forest fires, land movements and earthquakes (very low seismicity). It is also exposed to a particular risk of radon. A website published by BRGM makes it possible to assess the risks of a property located simply and quickly, either by its address or by the number of its plot.

==== Natural ====
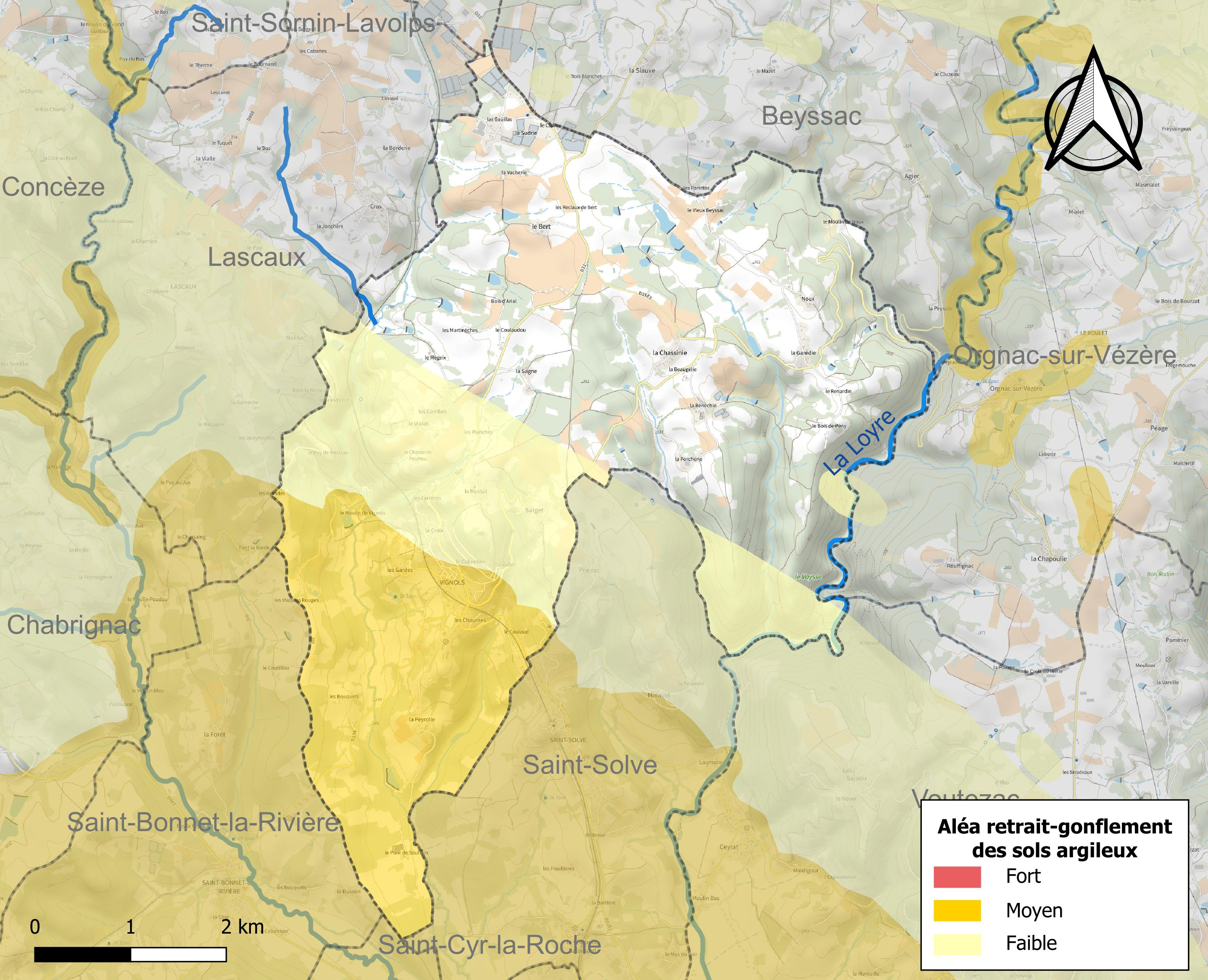
Map of the shrinkage-swelling hazard zones of the clay soils of Vignols.

The commune is vulnerable to the risk of land movements, mainly consisting of the shrinkage and swelling of clay soils. This hazard is likely to cause significant damage to buildings in the event of alternating periods of drought and rain. 22.9% of the municipal area is at medium or high hazard (26.8% at the departmental level and 48.5% at the national level). Of the 363 buildings counted in the municipality in 2019, 162 are at medium or high hazard, i.e. 45%, compared to 36% at the departmental level and 54% at the national level. A map of the exposure of the national territory to shrinkage and swelling of clay soils is available on the BRGM website.

In addition, in order to better understand the risk of land subsidence, the national inventory of underground cavities makes it possible to locate those located in the municipality.

Concerning forest fires, no forest fire risk prevention plan (PPRIF) has been established in Corrèze, nevertheless the urban planning code requires that risks be taken into account in urban planning documents. The perimeter of public utility easements and areas of legal obligation to clear brush for individuals is defined for the municipality in a dedicated map.

==== Special risk ====
In several parts of the country, radon, accumulated in certain homes or other premises, can be a significant source of exposure of the population to ionising radiation. Some municipalities in the department are concerned by the relatively high risk of radon. According to the 2018 classification, the municipality of Vignols is classified as zone 3, i.e. an area with significant radon potential.

== History ==
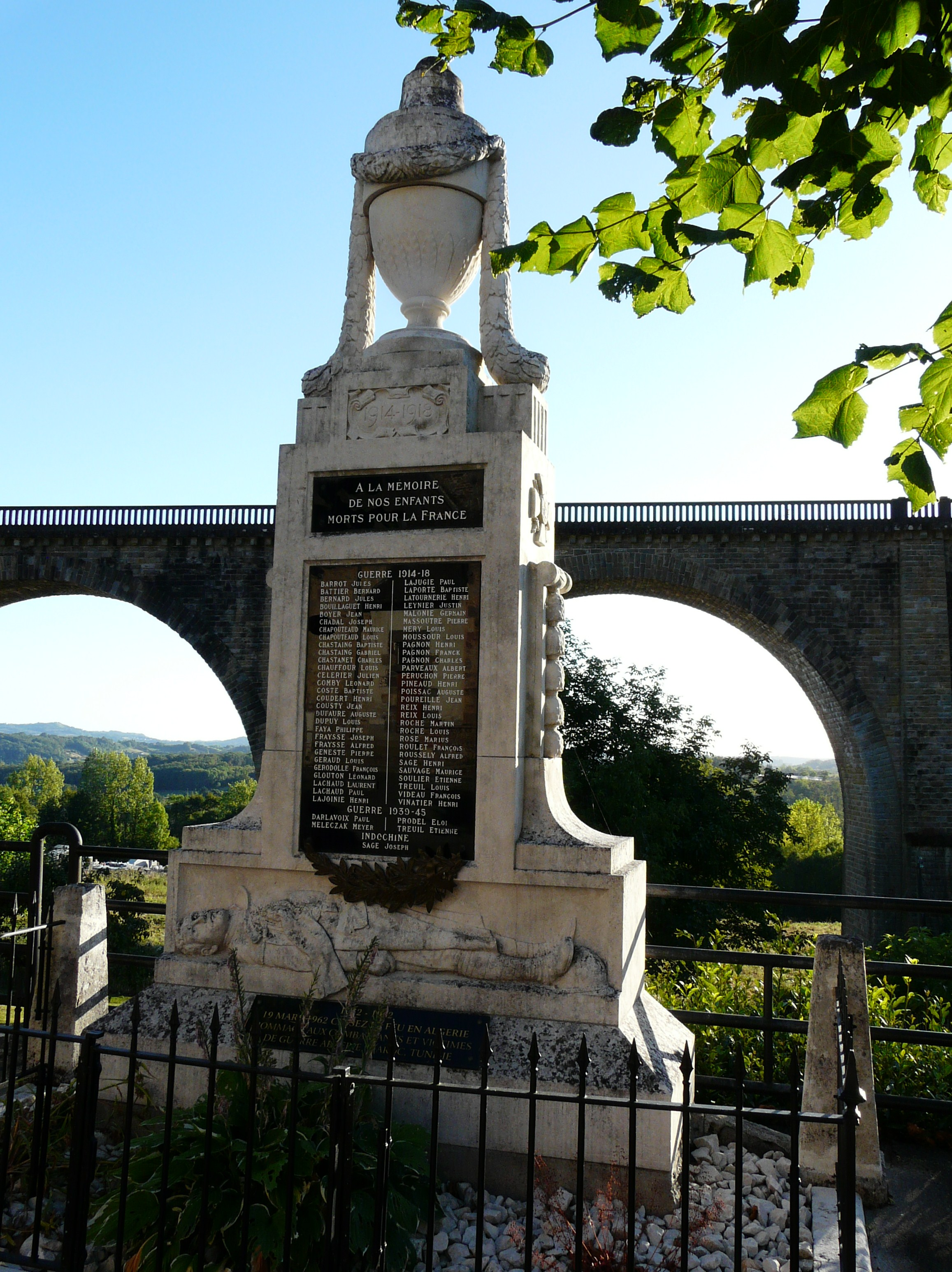
The war memorial.

The first deed on which the name of Vignols appears on dates from 766. After having plundered and ravaged the village, Pepin the Short made a gift to the bishop of Limoges to make amends for his sins. This is why, until the Revolution, Vignols was part of the property of the chapter of Saint-Étienne. Well exposed, the land on the hillsides provided wine for the entire bishopric of Limoges. The name Vignols clearly marks this reputation that the 2,000 barrels produced annually once justified. This culture has almost completely disappeared.

Until the First World War, the prosperity of the commune came mainly from agriculture and slate quarries, the production of which still covers many of the roofs of the town. In 1872, the construction of the railway line from Nexon to Brive-la-Gaillarde provided, in addition to seven ashlar viaducts, a means of transport for local production. In 1905, several tons of porcini mushrooms were shipped per week in the autumn. Then, like all small communes, Vignols paid a heavy price in the First World War, with 45 killed.

From 1,148 inhabitants before this war, the population decreased to 569 in 2013.

== Population ==
Historical population
Year	Pop.	±% p.a.
1968	655	—
1975	587	−1.55%
1982	605	+0.43%
1990	582	−0.48%
1999	563	−0.37%
2007	570	+0.15%
2012	581	+0.38%
2017	550	−1.09%
2023	536	−0.43%
Source: INSEE

== Local culture and heritage ==
=== Places and monuments ===
- The church of Saint-Laurent, from the thirteenth century, was listed as a historical monument in 1927 for its apse in the shape of a scallop shell.
- A wayside cross, of which only the arms and head of Christ have been preserved, is set in a wall on rue Pierre-Eyrolles; It was listed as a historical monument in 1927, then in 2013.
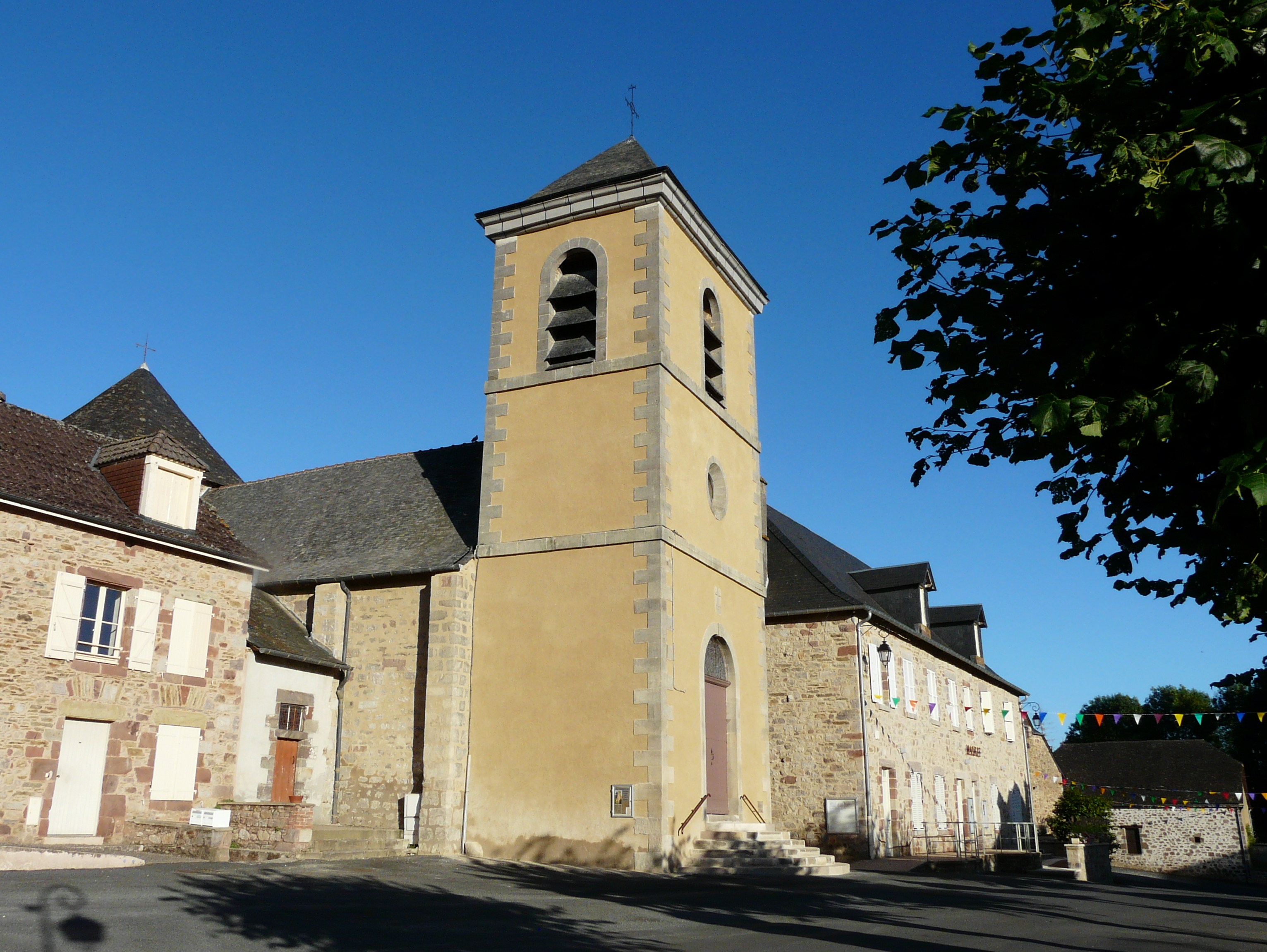
  The church of Saint-Laurent.
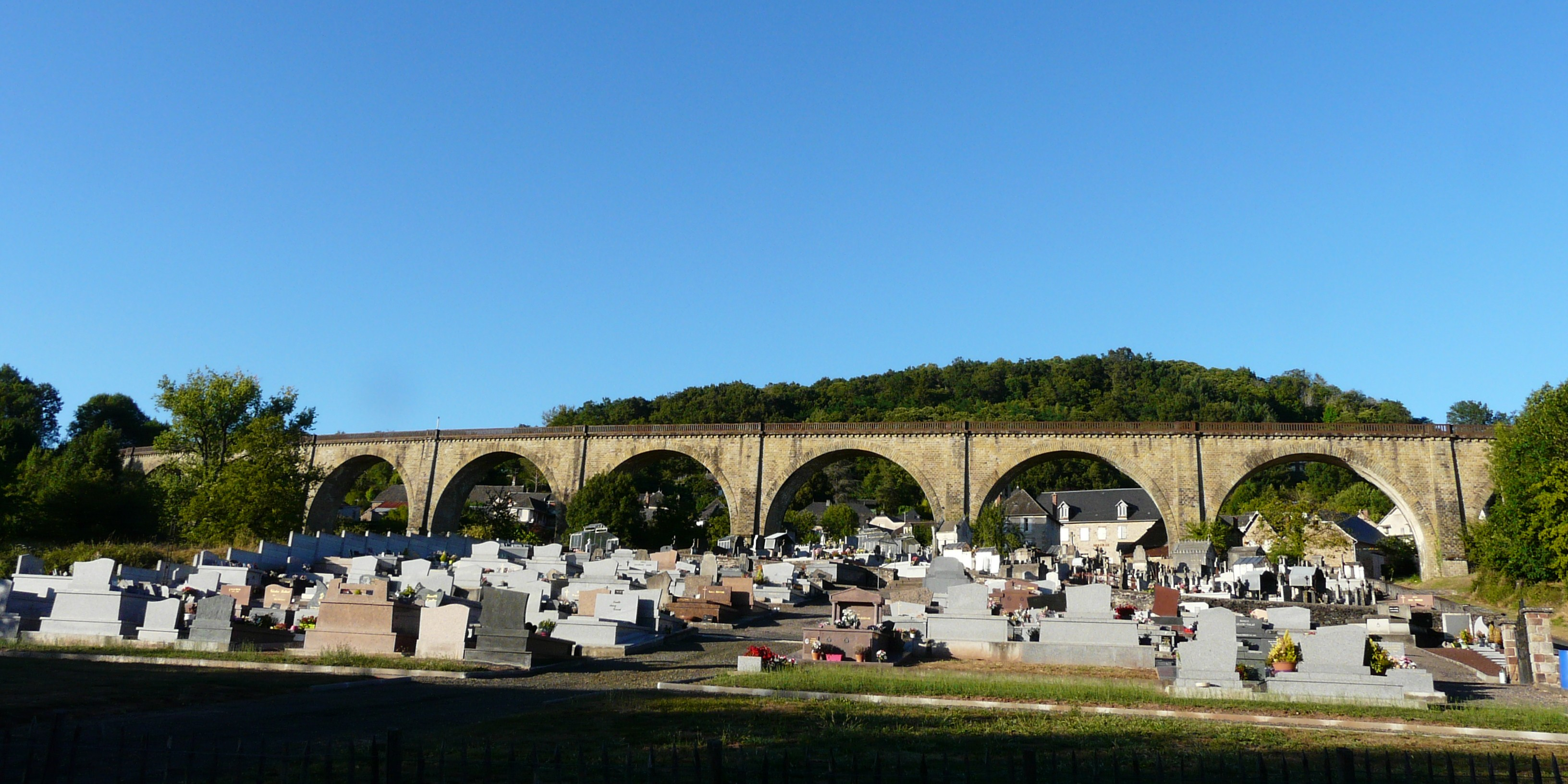
  The village viaduct.
  The town and the viaducts of Vignols have been a listed site since 1991.

=== Natural heritage ===
The commune of Vignols comprises:

- a Natura 2000 area: the valley of the Moulin de Vignols stream.
- two ZNIEFFs: the valley of the Moulin de Vignols stream and the Loyre and Vaysse gorges.

=== Personalities linked to the commune ===
- Claude Mazeaud (born 1937) in Vignols, professional cyclist.

=== Heraldry ===
Coat of arms	Sable with a lion Or armed, lampassé and crowned Gules.
Details	Adopted on 31 January 1988.

=== See also ===
- Communes of the Corrèze department
