= Arrondissement of Brive-la-Gaillarde =

Coordinates: 45.15°N 1.53°E

Brive-la-Gaillarde
- Arrondissement
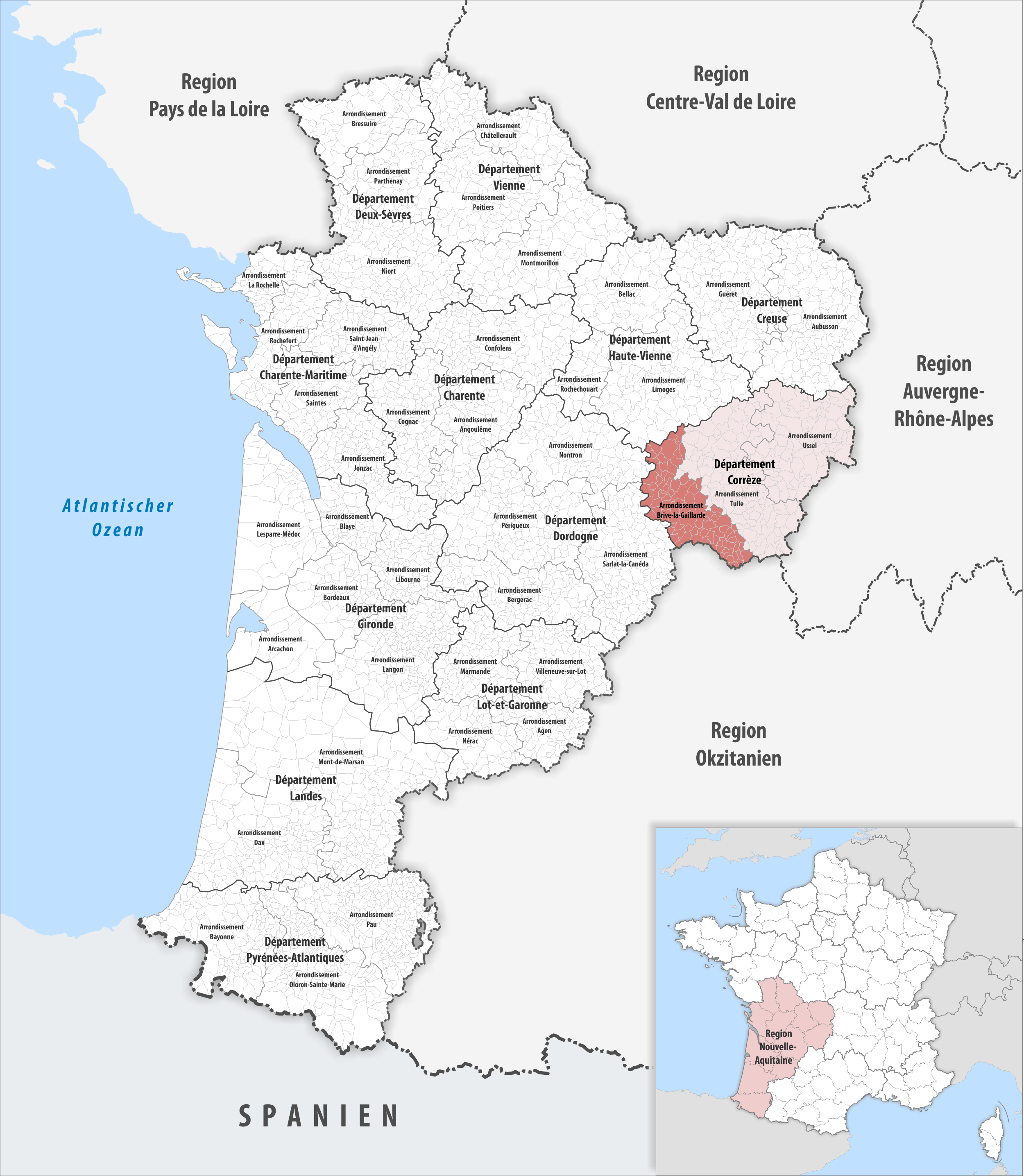
- Location within the region Nouvelle-Aquitaine
- Country: France
- Region: Nouvelle-Aquitaine
- Department: Corrèze
- No. of communes: {{{nbcomm}}}
- Area: 1,471.2 km^{2} (568.0 sq mi)
- Population (2023): 129,791
  - Density: 88.221/km^{2} (228.49/sq mi)
- INSEE code: 191

The arrondissement of Brive-la-Gaillarde is an arrondissement of France in the Corrèze departement in the Nouvelle-Aquitaine region. It has 95 communes. Its population is 128,968 (2021), and its area is 1,471.2 km^{2} (568.0 sq mi).

== Composition ==
The communes of the arrondissement of Brive-la-Gaillarde, and their INSEE codes, are:

1. Albignac (19003)
2. Allassac (19005)
3. Altillac (19007)
4. Arnac-Pompadour (19011)
5. Astaillac (19012)
6. Aubazines (19013)
7. Ayen (19015)
8. Beaulieu-sur-Dordogne (19019)
9. Benayes (19022)
10. Beynat (19023)
11. Beyssac (19024)
12. Beyssenac (19025)
13. Bilhac (19026)
14. Branceilles (19029)
15. Brignac-la-Plaine (19030)
16. Brive-la-Gaillarde (19031)
17. Chabrignac (19035)
18. La Chapelle-aux-Brocs (19043)
19. La Chapelle-aux-Saints (19044)
20. Chartrier-Ferrière (19047)
21. Chasteaux (19049)
22. Chauffour-sur-Vell (19050)
23. Chenailler-Mascheix (19054)
24. Collonges-la-Rouge (19057)
25. Concèze (19059)
26. Cosnac (19063)
27. Cublac (19066)
28. Curemonte (19067)
29. Dampniat (19068)
30. Donzenac (19072)
31. Estivals (19077)
32. Estivaux (19078)
33. Jugeals-Nazareth (19093)
34. Juillac (19094)
35. Lagleygeolle (19099)
36. Lanteuil (19105)
37. Larche (19107)
38. Lascaux (19109)
39. Ligneyrac (19115)
40. Liourdres (19116)
41. Lissac-sur-Couze (19117)
42. Lostanges (19119)
43. Louignac (19120)
44. Lubersac (19121)
45. Malemort (19123)
46. Mansac (19124)
47. Marcillac-la-Croze (19126)
48. Ménoire (19132)
49. Meyssac (19138)
50. Montgibaud (19144)
51. Nespouls (19147)
52. Noailhac (19150)
53. Noailles (19151)
54. Nonards (19152)
55. Objat (19153)
56. Palazinges (19156)
57. Perpezac-le-Blanc (19161)
58. Le Pescher (19163)
59. Puy-d'Arnac (19169)
60. Queyssac-les-Vignes (19170)
61. Rosiers-de-Juillac (19177)
62. Sadroc (19178)
63. Saillac (19179)
64. Saint-Aulaire (19182)
65. Saint-Bazile-de-Meyssac (19184)
66. Saint-Bonnet-la-Rivière (19187)
67. Saint-Bonnet-l'Enfantier (19188)
68. Saint-Cernin-de-Larche (19191)
69. Saint-Cyprien (19195)
70. Saint-Cyr-la-Roche (19196)
71. Sainte-Féréole (19202)
72. Saint-Éloy-les-Tuileries (19198)
73. Saint-Julien-le-Vendômois (19216)
74. Saint-Julien-Maumont (19217)
75. Saint-Pantaléon-de-Larche (19229)
76. Saint-Pardoux-l'Ortigier (19234)
77. Saint-Robert (19239)
78. Saint-Solve (19242)
79. Saint-Sornin-Lavolps (19243)
80. Saint-Viance (19246)
81. Segonzac (19253)
82. Ségur-le-Château (19254)
83. Sérilhac (19257)
84. Sioniac (19260)
85. Troche (19270)
86. Les Trois-Saints (partly)(19248)
87. Tudeils (19271)
88. Turenne (19273)
89. Ussac (19274)
90. Varetz (19278)
91. Vars-sur-Roseix (19279)
92. Végennes (19280)
93. Vignols (19286)
94. Voutezac (19288)
95. Yssandon (19289)

== History ==
The arrondissement of Brive-la-Gaillarde was created in 1800. At the January 2017 reorganisation of the arrondissements of Corrèze, it gained two communes from the arrondissement of Tulle, and it lost three communes to the arrondissement of Tulle.

As a result of the reorganisation of the cantons of France which came into effect in 2015, the borders of the cantons are no longer related to the borders of the arrondissements. The cantons of the arrondissement of Brive-la-Gaillarde were, as of January 2015:

1. Ayen
2. Beaulieu-sur-Dordogne
3. Beynat
4. Brive-la-Gaillarde-Centre
5. Brive-la-Gaillarde-Nord-Est
6. Brive-la-Gaillarde-Nord-Ouest
7. Brive-la-Gaillarde-Sud-Est
8. Brive-la-Gaillarde-Sud-Ouest
9. Donzenac
10. Juillac
11. Larche
12. Lubersac
13. Malemort-sur-Corrèze
14. Meyssac
15. Vigeois
