= Communauté d'agglomération du Bassin de Brive =

Bassin de Brive
- Communauté d'agglomération
- Interactive map of Bassin de Brive
- Coordinates: 45°10′N 01°32′E
- Country: France
- Region: Nouvelle-Aquitaine
- Department: Corrèze
- No. of communes: {{{nbcomm}}}
- Established: 2014
- Area: 808.7 km^{2} (312.2 sq mi)
- Population (2017): 107,749
  - Density: 133.2/km^{2} (345.1/sq mi)
- Website: www.agglodebrive.fr

Communauté d'agglomération du Bassin de Brive is an intercommunal structure, centred on the city of Brive-la-Gaillarde. It is located in the Corrèze department, in the Nouvelle-Aquitaine region, south-central France. It was created in January 2014. Its seat is in Brive-la-Gaillarde. Its area is 808.7 km^{2}. Its population was 107,749 in 2017, of which 46,916 in Brive-la-Gaillarde proper.

== Composition ==
The communauté d'agglomération consists of the following 48 communes:

1. Allassac
2. Ayen
3. Brignac-la-Plaine
4. Brive-la-Gaillarde
5. Chabrignac
6. La Chapelle-aux-Brocs
7. Chartrier-Ferrière
8. Chasteaux
9. Cosnac
10. Cublac
11. Dampniat
12. Donzenac
13. Estivals
14. Estivaux
15. Jugeals-Nazareth
16. Juillac
17. Larche
18. Lascaux
19. Lissac-sur-Couze
20. Louignac
21. Malemort
22. Mansac
23. Nespouls
24. Noailles
25. Objat
26. Perpezac-le-Blanc
27. Rosiers-de-Juillac
28. Sadroc
29. Saint-Aulaire
30. Saint-Bonnet-la-Rivière
31. Saint-Bonnet-l'Enfantier
32. Saint-Cernin-de-Larche
33. Saint-Cyprien
34. Saint-Cyr-la-Roche
35. Sainte-Féréole
36. Saint-Pantaléon-de-Larche
37. Saint-Pardoux-l'Ortigier
38. Saint-Robert
39. Saint-Solve
40. Saint-Viance
41. Segonzac
42. Turenne
43. Ussac
44. Varetz
45. Vars-sur-Roseix
46. Vignols
47. Voutezac
48. Yssandon
