= Concèze =

- Commune
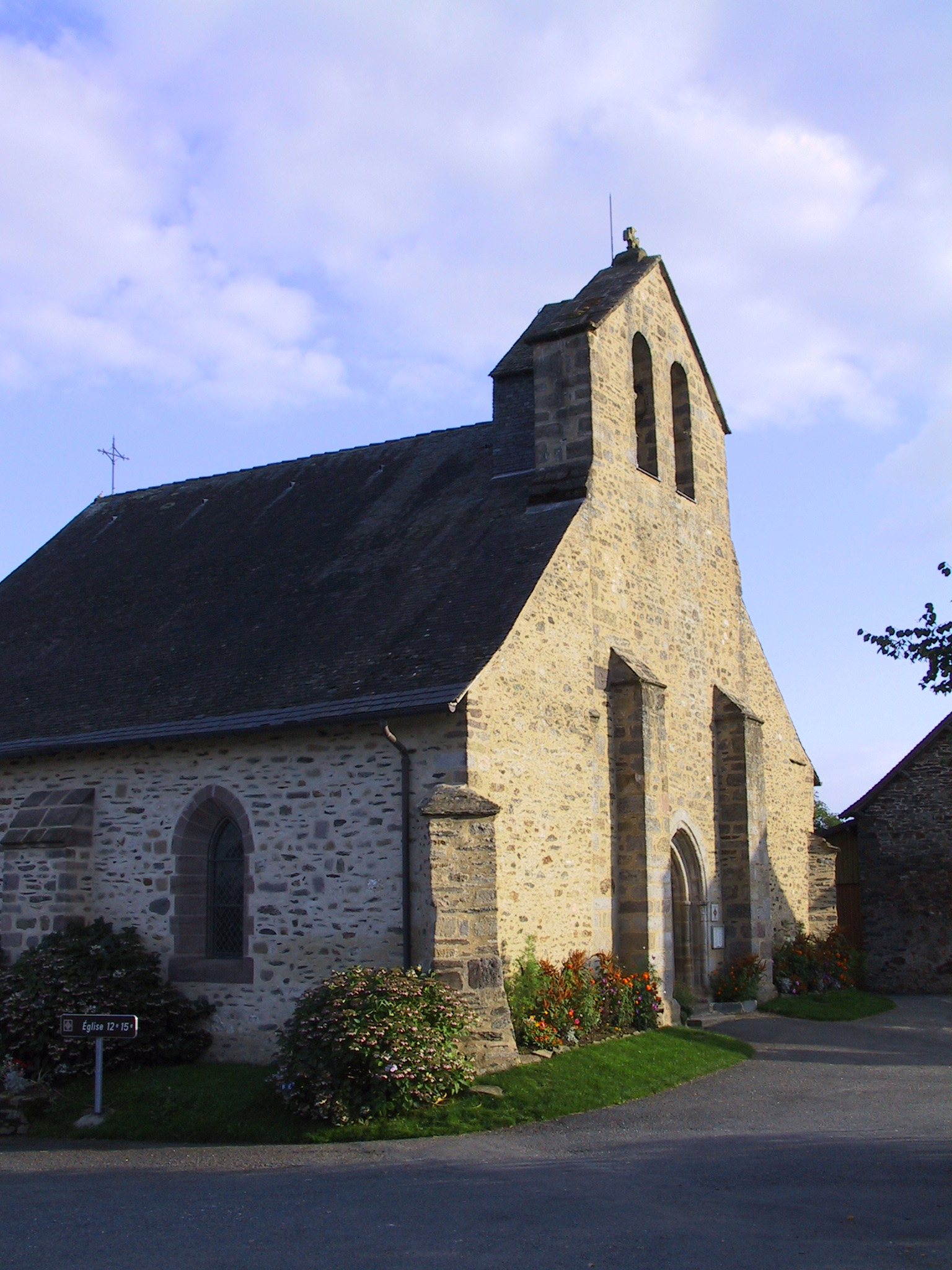
- The church of Saint-Julien-de-Brioude, in Concèze

- Coat of arms
- Location of Concèze
- Location within France Location within Nouvelle-Aquitaine
- Coordinates: 45°21′20″N 1°20′44″E
- Country: France
- Region: Nouvelle-Aquitaine
- Department: Corrèze
- Arrondissement: Brive-la-Gaillarde
- Canton: L'Yssandonnais

Government
  - Mayor (2020–2026): Pascal Hermand
- Area^{1}: 13.44 km^{2} (5.19 sq mi)
- Elevation: 410 m (1,350 ft)
- Highest elevation: 425 m (1,394 ft)
- Lowest elevation: 191 m (627 ft)
- Population (2023): 376
  - Density: 28.0/km^{2} (72.5/sq mi)
- Time zone: UTC+01:00 (CET)
  - Summer (DST): UTC+02:00 (CEST)
- INSEE/Postal code: 19059 /19350
- ^{1} French Land Register data, which excludes lakes, ponds, glaciers > 1 km^{2} (0.386 sq mi or 247 acres) and river estuaries.

Concèze (French pronunciation: [kɔ̃sɛz]; Occitan: Concèsa) is a commune in the Corrèze department in central France. It is famous for its raspberry festival held annually in July and features in the Guinness Book of Records for the largest raspberry tart made in place within the world.

== Population ==
Historical population
Year	Pop.	±% p.a.
1968	418	—
1975	403	−0.52%
1982	369	−1.25%
1990	362	−0.24%
1999	395	+0.97%
2007	406	+0.34%
2012	414	+0.39%
2017	413	−0.05%
2023	376	−1.55%
Source: INSEE

== Events ==
Concèze is well known in France for its annual Poetry Festival, in August.

== See also ==
- Communes of the Corrèze department
