= Dampniat =

- Commune
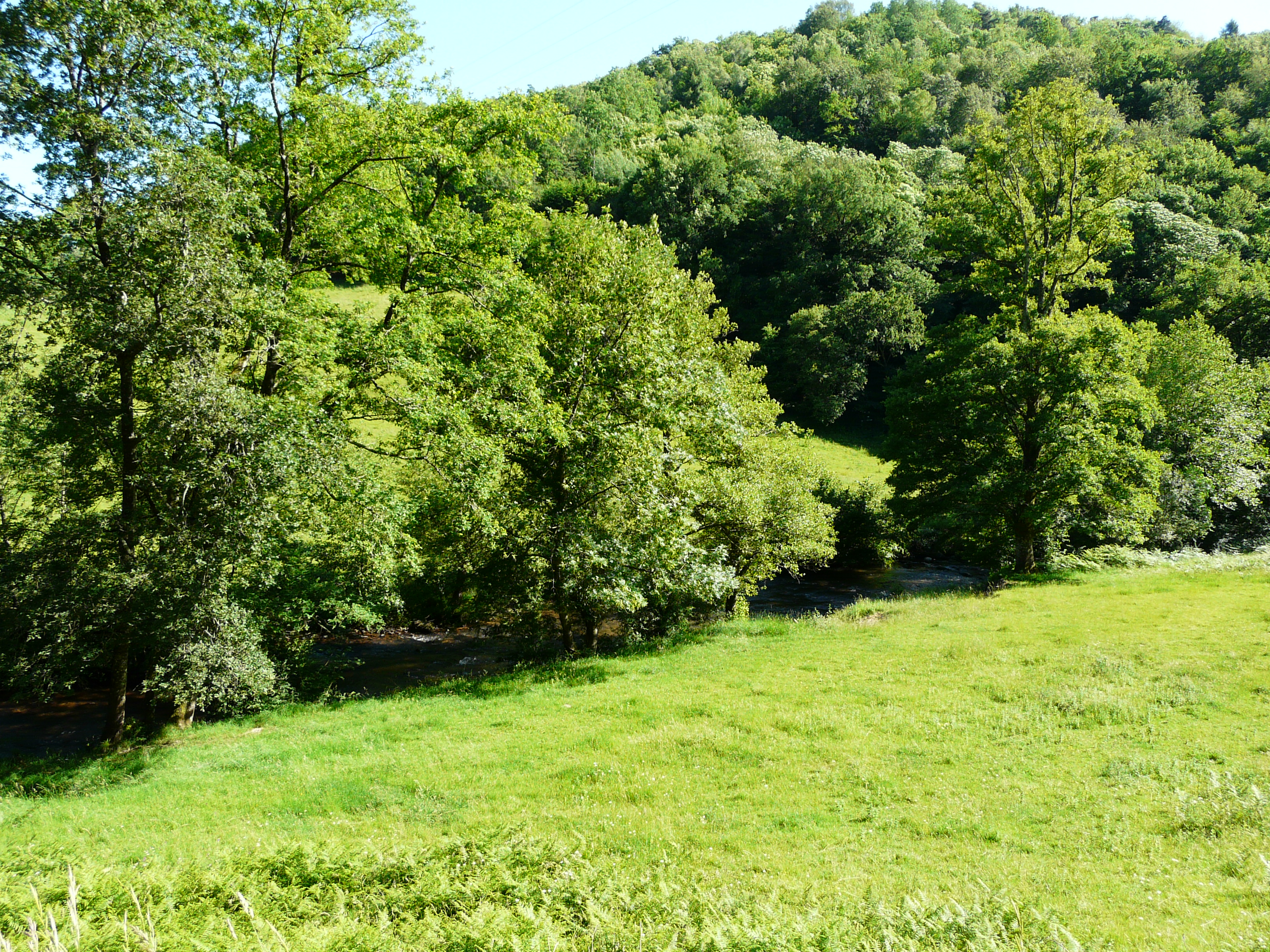
- The Rouanne valley, in Dampniat

- Coat of arms
- Location of Dampniat
- Location within France Location within Nouvelle-Aquitaine
- Coordinates: 45°10′05″N 1°37′55″E
- Country: France
- Region: Nouvelle-Aquitaine
- Department: Corrèze
- Arrondissement: Brive-la-Gaillarde
- Canton: Malemort
- Intercommunality: CA Bassin de Brive

Government
  - Mayor (2024–2026): Laurent Galland
- Area^{1}: 15.38 km^{2} (5.94 sq mi)
- Elevation: 240 m (790 ft)
- Highest elevation: 377 m (1,237 ft)
- Lowest elevation: 116 m (381 ft)
- Population (2023): 716
  - Density: 46.6/km^{2} (121/sq mi)
- Time zone: UTC+01:00 (CET)
  - Summer (DST): UTC+02:00 (CEST)
- INSEE/Postal code: 19068 /19360
- ^{1} French Land Register data, which excludes lakes, ponds, glaciers > 1 km^{2} (0.386 sq mi or 247 acres) and river estuaries.

Dampniat (French pronunciation: [danja]; Occitan: Dampnhac) is a commune in the Corrèze department in central France.

== Population ==
Historical population
Year	Pop.	±% p.a.
1968	608	—
1975	598	−0.24%
1982	546	−1.29%
1990	569	+0.52%
1999	580	+0.21%
2007	648	+1.40%
2012	714	+1.96%
2017	727	+0.36%
2023	716	−0.25%
Source: INSEE

== See also ==
- Communes of the Corrèze department
