= Lascaux, Corrèze =

Lascaux
- Commune
- Coat of arms
- Location of Lascaux
- Location within France Location within Nouvelle-Aquitaine
- Coordinates: 45°20′24″N 1°21′56″E
- Country: France
- Region: Nouvelle-Aquitaine
- Department: Corrèze
- Arrondissement: Brive-la-Gaillarde
- Canton: L'Yssandonnais
- Intercommunality: CA Bassin de Brive

Government
  - Mayor (2020–2026): Alain Zizard
- Area^{1}: 7.26 km^{2} (2.80 sq mi)
- Elevation: 303 m (994 ft)
- Highest elevation: 403 m (1,322 ft)
- Lowest elevation: 193 m (633 ft)
- Population (2023): 228
  - Density: 31.4/km^{2} (81.3/sq mi)
- Time zone: UTC+01:00 (CET)
  - Summer (DST): UTC+02:00 (CEST)
- INSEE/Postal code: 19109 /19130
- ^{1} French Land Register data, which excludes lakes, ponds, glaciers > 1 km^{2} (0.386 sq mi or 247 acres) and river estuaries.

Lascaux (French pronunciation: [lasko]; Occitan: Las Caums) is a commune in the Corrèze department in south-central France.

== Population ==
Historical population
Year	Pop.	±% p.a.
1968	252	—
1975	221	−1.86%
1982	193	−1.92%
1990	167	−1.79%
1999	154	−0.90%
2007	170	+1.24%
2012	194	+2.68%
2017	218	+2.36%
2023	228	+0.75%
Source: INSEE

== See also ==
- Communes of the Corrèze department
