= Voutezac =

- Commune
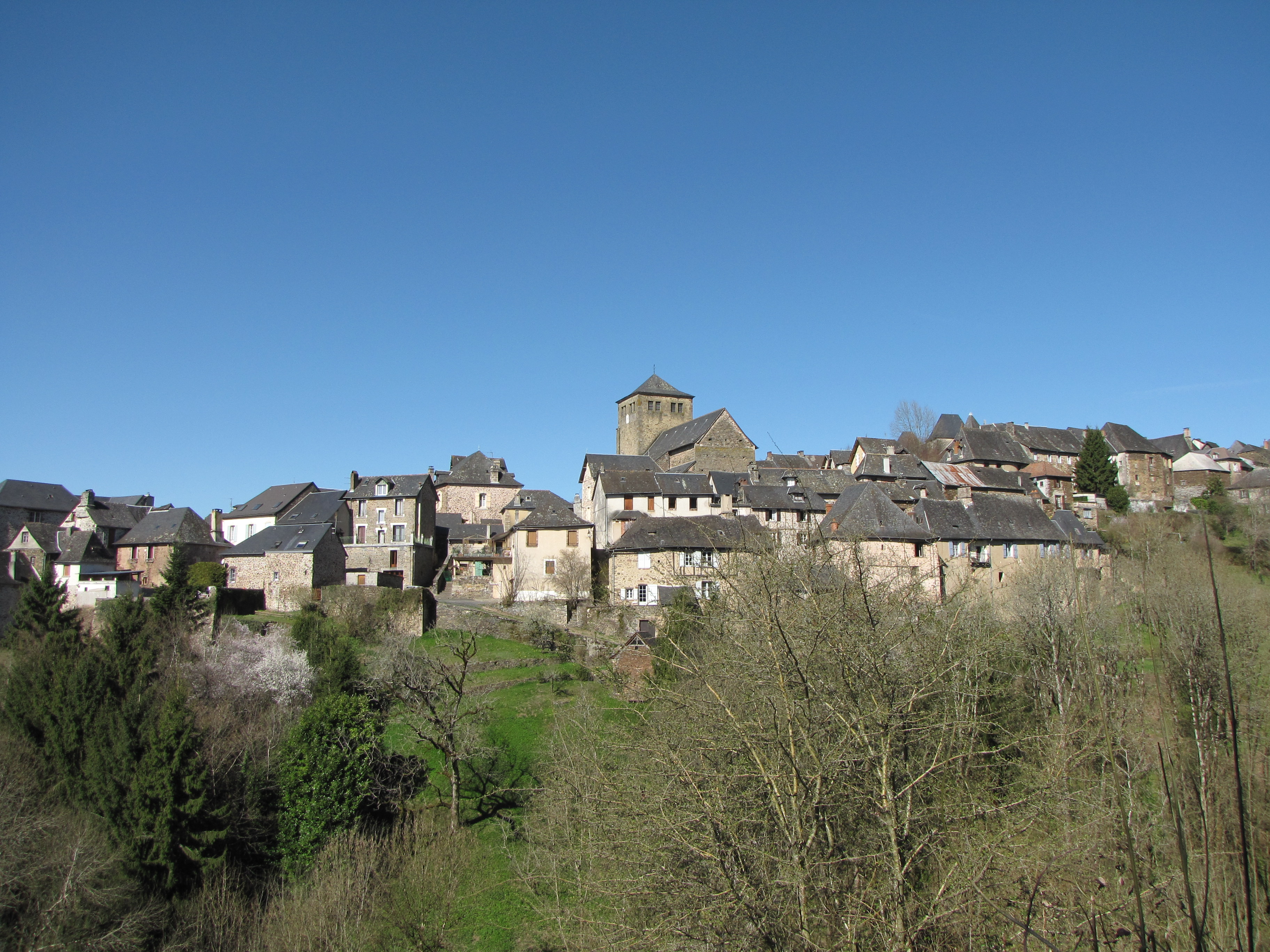
- A general view of Voutezac

- Coat of arms
- Location of Voutezac
- Location within France Location within Nouvelle-Aquitaine
- Coordinates: 45°17′35″N 1°26′17″E
- Country: France
- Region: Nouvelle-Aquitaine
- Department: Corrèze
- Arrondissement: Brive-la-Gaillarde
- Canton: L'Yssandonnais
- Intercommunality: Bassin de Brive

Government
  - Mayor (2023–2026): Jean-Claude Reynaud
- Area^{1}: 22.38 km^{2} (8.64 sq mi)
- Elevation: 225 m (738 ft)
- Highest elevation: 402 m (1,319 ft)
- Lowest elevation: 105 m (344 ft)
- Population (2023): 1,249
  - Density: 55.81/km^{2} (144.5/sq mi)
- Time zone: UTC+01:00 (CET)
  - Summer (DST): UTC+02:00 (CEST)
- INSEE/Postal code: 19288 /19130
- ^{1} French Land Register data, which excludes lakes, ponds, glaciers > 1 km^{2} (0.386 sq mi or 247 acres) and river estuaries.

Voutezac (French pronunciation: [vut.zak]; Occitan: Voltesac) is a commune in the Corrèze department in central France.

== Population ==
Historical population
Year	Pop.	±% p.a.
1968	1,197	—
1975	1,071	−1.58%
1982	1,053	−0.24%
1990	1,026	−0.32%
1999	1,142	+1.20%
2007	1,195	+0.57%
2012	1,261	+1.08%
2017	1,259	−0.03%
2023	1,249	−0.13%
Source: INSEE

== See also ==
- Communes of the Corrèze department
