= Saint-Cyprien, Corrèze =

Saint-Cyprien
- Commune
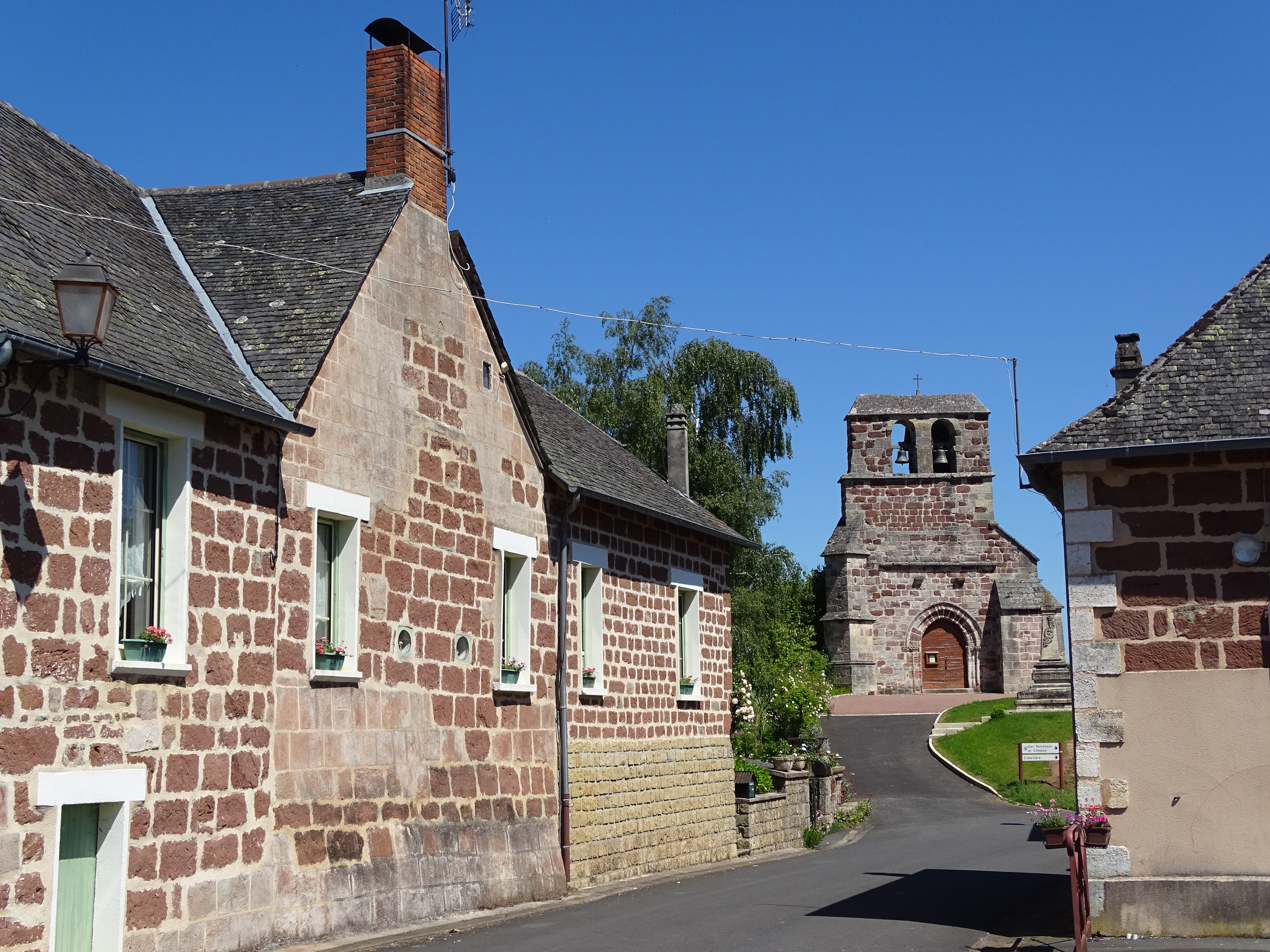
- The village and the church

- Coat of arms
- Location of Saint-Cyprien
- Location within France Location within Nouvelle-Aquitaine
- Coordinates: 45°15′06″N 1°21′10″E
- Country: France
- Region: Nouvelle-Aquitaine
- Department: Corrèze
- Arrondissement: Brive-la-Gaillarde
- Canton: L'Yssandonnais
- Intercommunality: CA Bassin de Brive

Government
  - Mayor (2020–2026): Franck Delteral
- Area^{1}: 7.86 km^{2} (3.03 sq mi)
- Elevation: 210 m (690 ft)
- Highest elevation: 330 m (1,080 ft)
- Lowest elevation: 116 m (381 ft)
- Population (2023): 377
  - Density: 48.0/km^{2} (124/sq mi)
- Time zone: UTC+01:00 (CET)
  - Summer (DST): UTC+02:00 (CEST)
- INSEE/Postal code: 19195 /19130
- ^{1} French Land Register data, which excludes lakes, ponds, glaciers > 1 km^{2} (0.386 sq mi or 247 acres) and river estuaries.

Saint-Cyprien (French pronunciation: [sɛ̃ sipʁijɛ̃]; Limousin: Sent Cibran) is a commune in the Corrèze department in central France.

== Population ==
Historical population
Year	Pop.	±% p.a.
1968	201	—
1975	197	−0.29%
1982	190	−0.52%
1990	242	+3.07%
1999	248	+0.27%
2007	299	+2.37%
2012	385	+5.19%
2017	384	−0.05%
2023	377	−0.31%
Source: INSEE

== See also ==
- Communes of the Corrèze department
