= Yssandon =

- Commune
- Coat of arms
- Location of Yssandon
- Location within France Location within Nouvelle-Aquitaine
- Coordinates: 45°12′33″N 1°22′38″E
- Country: France
- Region: Nouvelle-Aquitaine
- Department: Corrèze
- Arrondissement: Brive-la-Gaillarde
- Canton: L'Yssandonnais
- Intercommunality: Bassin de Brive

Government
  - Mayor (2022–2026): Didier Dubuis
- Area^{1}: 20.17 km^{2} (7.79 sq mi)
- Elevation: 460 m (1,510 ft)
- Highest elevation: 356 m (1,168 ft)
- Lowest elevation: 109 m (358 ft)
- Population (2023): 696
  - Density: 34.5/km^{2} (89.4/sq mi)
- Time zone: UTC+01:00 (CET)
  - Summer (DST): UTC+02:00 (CEST)
- INSEE/Postal code: 19289 /19310
- ^{1} French Land Register data, which excludes lakes, ponds, glaciers > 1 km^{2} (0.386 sq mi or 247 acres) and river estuaries.

Yssandon (French pronunciation: [isɑ̃dɔ̃]; Limousin: Eissandon) is a commune in the Corrèze department in central France.

== Population ==
Historical population
Year	Pop.	±% p.a.
1968	600	—
1975	560	−0.98%
1982	571	+0.28%
1990	608	+0.79%
1999	599	−0.17%
2007	616	+0.35%
2012	728	+3.40%
2017	682	−1.30%
2023	696	+0.34%
Source: INSEE

== See also ==
- Communes of the Corrèze department
