= Sadroc =

- Commune
- Coat of arms
- Location of Sadroc
- Location within France Location within Nouvelle-Aquitaine
- Coordinates: 45°17′02″N 1°33′00″E
- Country: France
- Region: Nouvelle-Aquitaine
- Department: Corrèze
- Arrondissement: Brive-la-Gaillarde
- Canton: Allassac
- Intercommunality: CA Bassin de Brive

Government
  - Mayor (2020–2026): Stéphane Bruxelles
- Area^{1}: 19.26 km^{2} (7.44 sq mi)
- Elevation: 380 m (1,250 ft)
- Highest elevation: 431 m (1,414 ft)
- Lowest elevation: 197 m (646 ft)
- Population (2023): 1,010
  - Density: 52.4/km^{2} (136/sq mi)
- Time zone: UTC+01:00 (CET)
  - Summer (DST): UTC+02:00 (CEST)
- INSEE/Postal code: 19178 /19270
- ^{1} French Land Register data, which excludes lakes, ponds, glaciers > 1 km^{2} (0.386 sq mi or 247 acres) and river estuaries.

Sadroc (French pronunciation: [sadʁɔk]; Occitan: Sadran) is a commune in the Corrèze department in central France.

== Population ==
Historical population
Year	Pop.	±% p.a.
1968	647	—
1975	586	−1.40%
1982	594	+0.19%
1990	634	+0.82%
1999	636	+0.04%
2007	755	+2.17%
2012	833	+1.99%
2017	937	+2.38%
2023	1,010	+1.26%
Source: INSEE

== See also ==
- Communes of the Corrèze department
