= Arboretum de la Tuillère =

Arboretum in Ayen, Corrèze, Limousin, France

Coordinates: 45.2544°N 1.3364°E

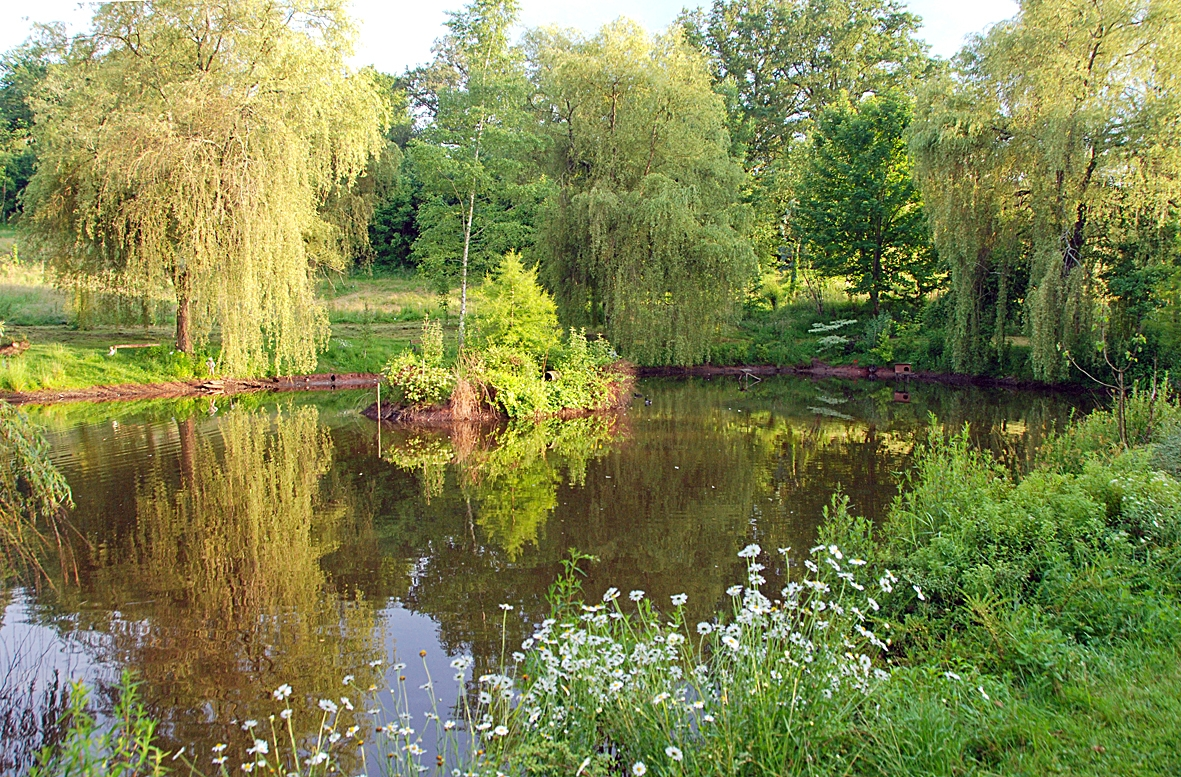
Pond Arboretum de la Tuillière

The Arboretum de la Tuillère is a arboretum located in Ayen, Corrèze, Limousin, France. The arboretum was created in 1990 and now contains about 1500 species of woody plants. It is open daily from sunrise to sunset.

== See also ==
- List of botanical gardens in France
