= Saint-Aulaire =

- Commune
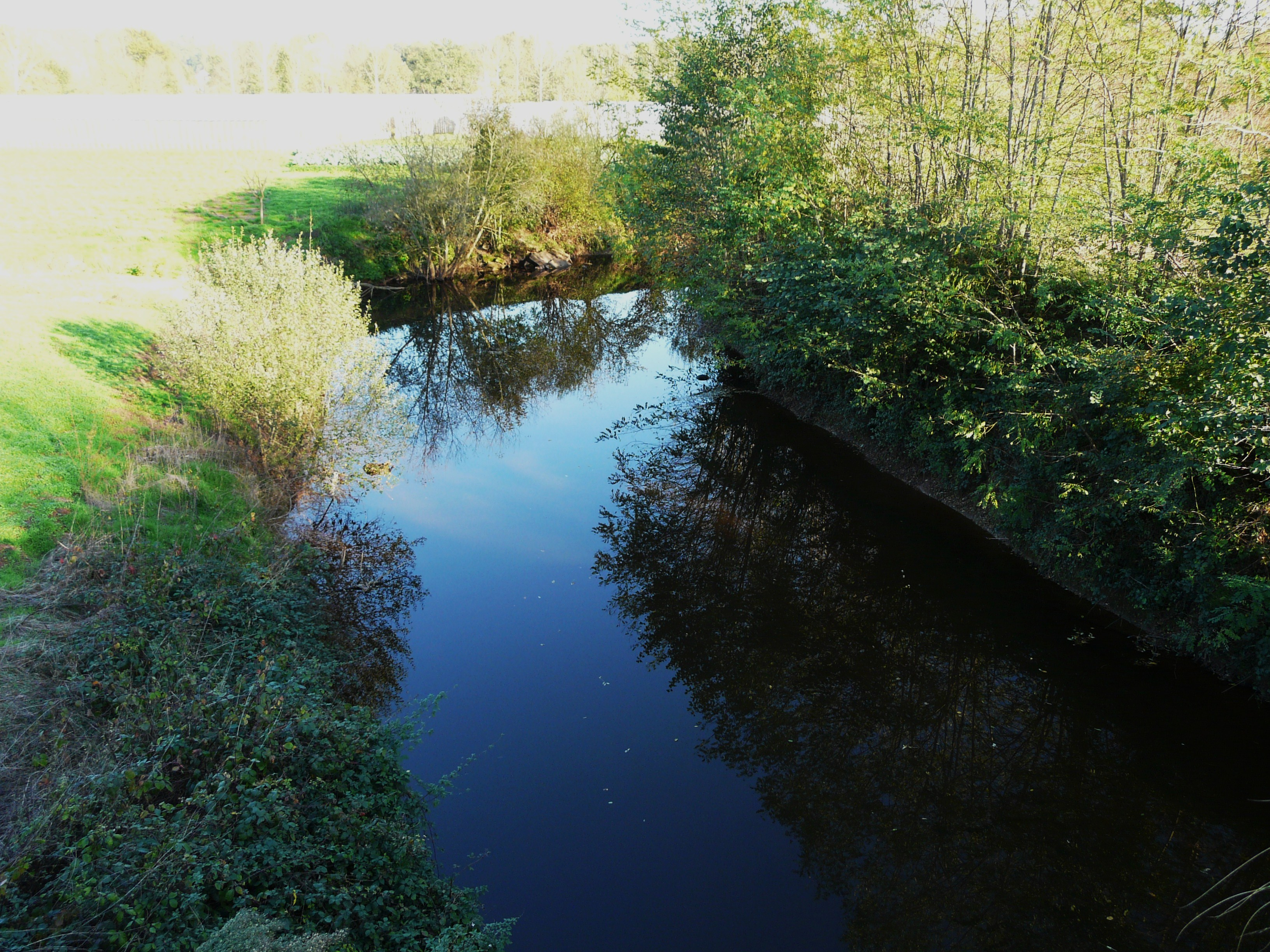
- The Roseix

- Coat of arms
- Location of Saint-Aulaire
- Location within France Location within Nouvelle-Aquitaine
- Coordinates: 45°13′57″N 1°22′24″E
- Country: France
- Region: Nouvelle-Aquitaine
- Department: Corrèze
- Arrondissement: Brive-la-Gaillarde
- Canton: L'Yssandonnais
- Intercommunality: CA Bassin de Brive

Government
  - Mayor (2024–2026): Francis Bordas
- Area^{1}: 10.79 km^{2} (4.17 sq mi)
- Elevation: 251 m (823 ft)
- Highest elevation: 337 m (1,106 ft)
- Lowest elevation: 103 m (338 ft)
- Population (2023): 773
  - Density: 71.6/km^{2} (186/sq mi)
- Time zone: UTC+01:00 (CET)
  - Summer (DST): UTC+02:00 (CEST)
- INSEE/Postal code: 19182 /19130
- ^{1} French Land Register data, which excludes lakes, ponds, glaciers > 1 km^{2} (0.386 sq mi or 247 acres) and river estuaries.

Saint-Aulaire (French pronunciation: [sɛ̃.t‿olɛʁ]; Occitan: Senta Aulària) is a commune in the Corrèze department in central France. Saint-Aulaire station has rail connections to Brive-la-Gaillarde, Saint-Yrieix and Limoges.

== Population ==
Historical population
Year	Pop.	±% p.a.
1968	742	—
1975	713	−0.57%
1982	746	+0.65%
1990	707	−0.67%
1999	744	+0.57%
2007	813	+1.11%
2012	838	+0.61%
2017	779	−1.45%
2023	773	−0.13%
Source: INSEE

== See also ==
- Communes of the Corrèze department
