= Saint-Pardoux-l'Ortigier =

- Commune
- Coat of arms
- Location of Saint-Pardoux-l'Ortigier
- Location within France Location within Nouvelle-Aquitaine
- Coordinates: 45°17′57″N 1°34′47″E
- Country: France
- Region: Nouvelle-Aquitaine
- Department: Corrèze
- Arrondissement: Brive-la-Gaillarde
- Canton: Allassac
- Intercommunality: CA Bassin de Brive

Government
  - Mayor (2024–2026): Christian Marcou
- Area^{1}: 12.98 km^{2} (5.01 sq mi)
- Elevation: 320 m (1,050 ft)
- Highest elevation: 423 m (1,388 ft)
- Lowest elevation: 286 m (938 ft)
- Population (2023): 485
  - Density: 37.4/km^{2} (96.8/sq mi)
- Time zone: UTC+01:00 (CET)
  - Summer (DST): UTC+02:00 (CEST)
- INSEE/Postal code: 19234 /19270
- ^{1} French Land Register data, which excludes lakes, ponds, glaciers > 1 km^{2} (0.386 sq mi or 247 acres) and river estuaries.

Saint-Pardoux-l'Ortigier (French pronunciation: [sɛ̃ paʁdu lɔʁtiʒje]; Occitan: Sent Pardós l'Urtigier) is a commune in the Corrèze department in central France.

== Population ==
Historical population
| Year | Pop. | ±% p.a. |
|---|---|---|
| 1968 | 452 | — |
| 1975 | 397 | −1.84% |
| 1982 | 395 | −0.07% |
| 1990 | 422 | +0.83% |
| 1999 | 404 | −0.48% |
| 2007 | 461 | +1.66% |
| 2012 | 477 | +0.68% |
| 2017 | 480 | +0.13% |
| 2023 | 485 | +0.17% |
Source: INSEE

== See also ==
- Communes of the Corrèze department
