= Brignac-la-Plaine =

- Commune
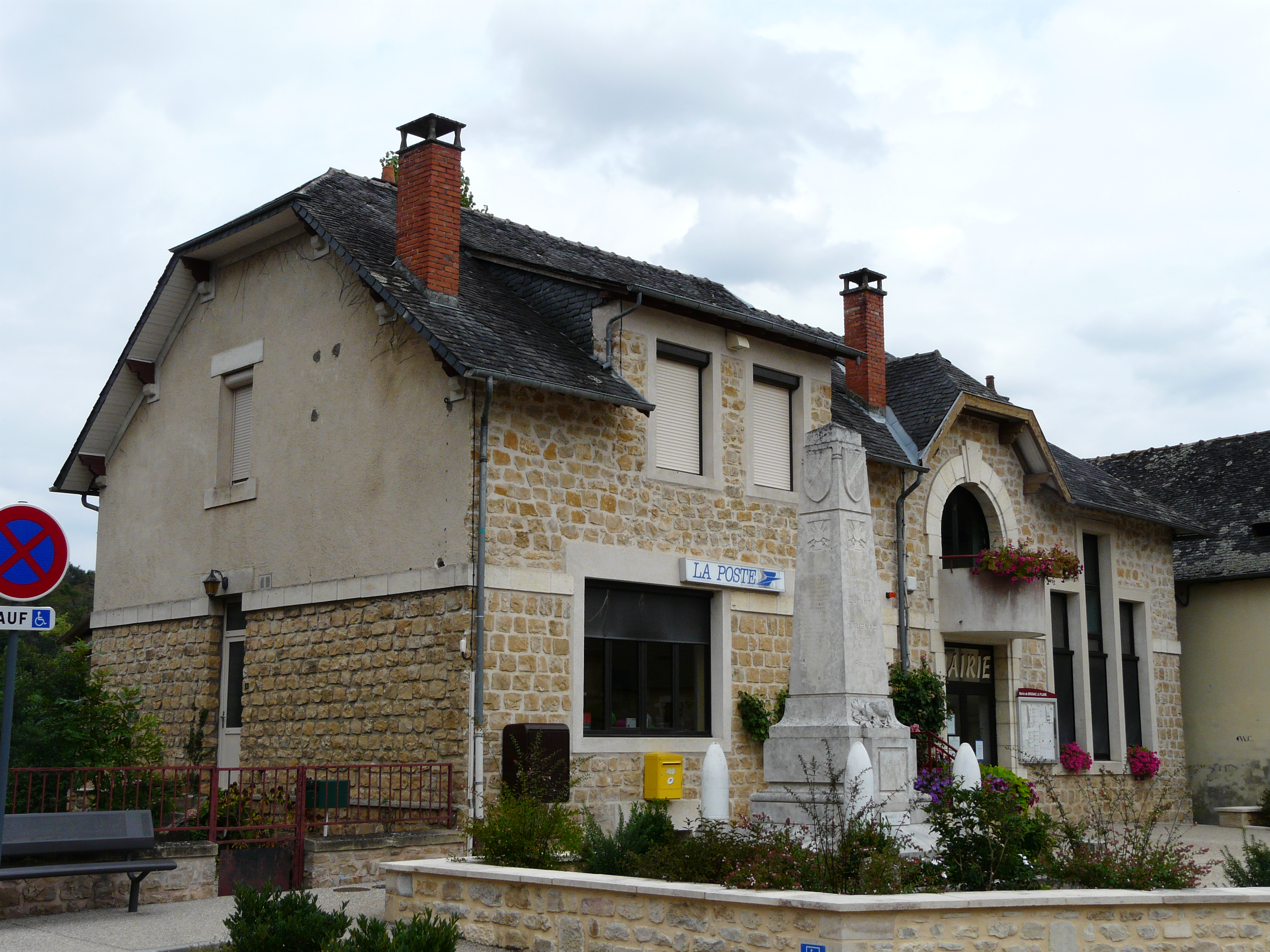
- Town hall

- Coat of arms
- Location of Brignac-la-Plaine
- Location within France Location within Nouvelle-Aquitaine
- Coordinates: 45°11′23″N 1°20′24″E
- Country: France
- Region: Nouvelle-Aquitaine
- Department: Corrèze
- Arrondissement: Brive-la-Gaillarde
- Canton: L'Yssandonnais
- Intercommunality: CA Bassin de Brive

Government
  - Mayor (2020–2026): Bernard Roussely
- Area^{1}: 18.72 km^{2} (7.23 sq mi)
- Elevation: 120 m (390 ft)
- Highest elevation: 336 m (1,102 ft)
- Lowest elevation: 99 m (325 ft)
- Population (2023): 977
  - Density: 52.2/km^{2} (135/sq mi)
- Time zone: UTC+01:00 (CET)
  - Summer (DST): UTC+02:00 (CEST)
- INSEE/Postal code: 19030 /19310
- ^{1} French Land Register data, which excludes lakes, ponds, glaciers > 1 km^{2} (0.386 sq mi or 247 acres) and river estuaries.

Brignac-la-Plaine (French pronunciation: [bʁiɲak la plɛn]; Occitan: Brenhac) is a commune in the Corrèze department in central France.

== Population ==
Historical population
Year	Pop.	±% p.a.
1968	757	—
1975	780	+0.43%
1982	781	+0.02%
1990	817	+0.56%
1999	808	−0.12%
2007	796	−0.19%
2012	912	+2.76%
2017	980	+1.45%
2023	977	−0.05%
Source: INSEE

== See also ==
- Communes of the Corrèze department

== See also ==
- Communes of the Corrèze department
