= La Chapelle-aux-Brocs =

- Commune
- Coat of arms
- Location of La Chapelle-aux-Brocs
- Location within France Location within Nouvelle-Aquitaine
- Coordinates: 45°08′49″N 1°37′38″E
- Country: France
- Region: Nouvelle-Aquitaine
- Department: Corrèze
- Arrondissement: Brive-la-Gaillarde
- Canton: Brive-la-Gaillarde-3
- Intercommunality: CA Bassin de Brive

Government
  - Mayor (2020–2026): Michel Beril
- Area^{1}: 4.99 km^{2} (1.93 sq mi)
- Elevation: 360 m (1,180 ft)
- Highest elevation: 349 m (1,145 ft)
- Lowest elevation: 137 m (449 ft)
- Population (2023): 448
  - Density: 89.8/km^{2} (233/sq mi)
- Time zone: UTC+01:00 (CET)
  - Summer (DST): UTC+02:00 (CEST)
- INSEE/Postal code: 19043 /19360
- ^{1} French Land Register data, which excludes lakes, ponds, glaciers > 1 km^{2} (0.386 sq mi or 247 acres) and river estuaries.

La Chapelle-aux-Brocs (French pronunciation: [la ʃapɛl o bʁo]; Occitan: La Chapela daus Bròsts) is a commune in the Corrèze department in central France.

== Population ==
Historical population
Year	Pop.	±% p.a.
1968	185	—
1975	200	+1.12%
1982	212	+0.84%
1990	345	+6.28%
1999	342	−0.10%
2007	366	+0.85%
2012	413	+2.45%
2017	427	+0.67%
2023	448	+0.80%
Source: INSEE

== See also ==
- Communes of the Corrèze department
