= Saint-Viance =

- Commune
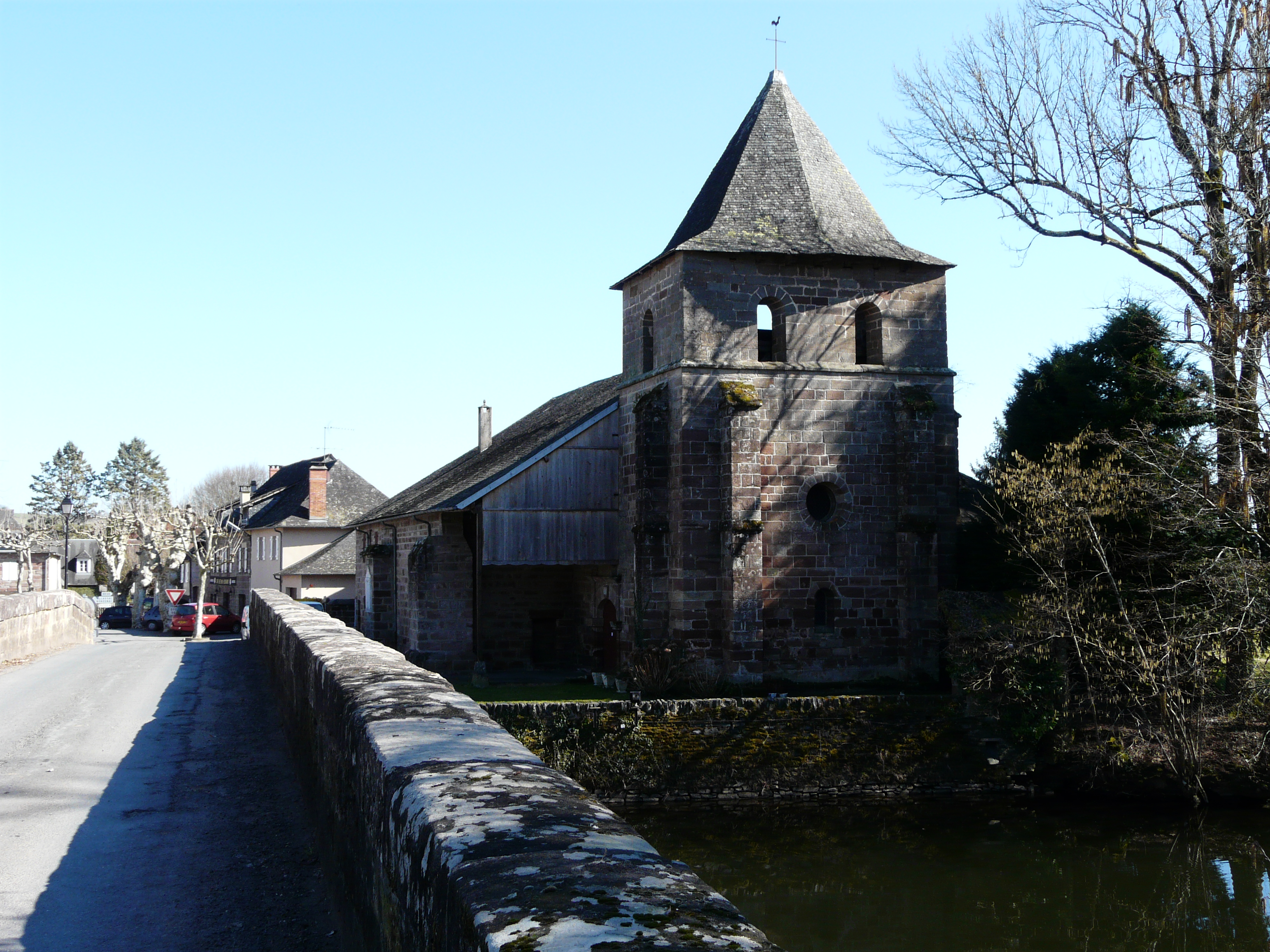
- The church in Saint-Viance

- Coat of arms
- Location of Saint-Viance
- Location within France Location within Nouvelle-Aquitaine
- Coordinates: 45°13′07″N 1°27′12″E
- Country: France
- Region: Nouvelle-Aquitaine
- Department: Corrèze
- Arrondissement: Brive-la-Gaillarde
- Canton: Allassac
- Intercommunality: CA Bassin de Brive

Government
  - Mayor (2023–2026): Bernard Continsouzas
- Area^{1}: 16.23 km^{2} (6.27 sq mi)
- Elevation: 192 m (630 ft)
- Highest elevation: 190 m (620 ft)
- Lowest elevation: 95 m (312 ft)
- Population (2023): 1,892
  - Density: 116.6/km^{2} (301.9/sq mi)
- Time zone: UTC+01:00 (CET)
  - Summer (DST): UTC+02:00 (CEST)
- INSEE/Postal code: 19246 /19240
- ^{1} French Land Register data, which excludes lakes, ponds, glaciers > 1 km^{2} (0.386 sq mi or 247 acres) and river estuaries.

Saint-Viance (French pronunciation: [sɛ̃ vjɑ̃s]; Occitan: Sent Viance) is a commune in the Corrèze department in central France.

== Population ==
Historical population
Year	Pop.	±% p.a.
1968	785	—
1975	847	+1.09%
1982	1,061	+3.27%
1990	1,407	+3.59%
1999	1,413	+0.05%
2007	1,595	+1.53%
2012	1,715	+1.46%
2017	1,853	+1.56%
2023	1,892	+0.35%
Source: INSEE

== See also ==
- Communes of the Corrèze department
