= Estivals =

- Commune
- Coat of arms
- Location of Estivals
- Location within France Location within Nouvelle-Aquitaine
- Coordinates: 45°01′45″N 1°27′45″E
- Country: France
- Region: Nouvelle-Aquitaine
- Department: Corrèze
- Arrondissement: Brive-la-Gaillarde
- Canton: Saint-Pantaléon-de-Larche
- Intercommunality: CA Bassin de Brive

Government
  - Mayor (2020–2026): Hubert Bournol
- Area^{1}: 8.88 km^{2} (3.43 sq mi)
- Elevation: 294 m (965 ft)
- Highest elevation: 356 m (1,168 ft)
- Lowest elevation: 253 m (830 ft)
- Population (2023): 135
  - Density: 15.2/km^{2} (39.4/sq mi)
- Time zone: UTC+01:00 (CET)
  - Summer (DST): UTC+02:00 (CEST)
- INSEE/Postal code: 19077 /19600
- ^{1} French Land Register data, which excludes lakes, ponds, glaciers > 1 km^{2} (0.386 sq mi or 247 acres) and river estuaries.

Estivals (French pronunciation: [ɛstival]; Occitan: Estiu) is a commune in the Corrèze department in central France.

== Population ==
Historical population
Year	Pop.	±% p.a.
1968	123	—
1975	101	−2.78%
1982	102	+0.14%
1990	109	+0.83%
1999	119	+0.98%
2007	130	+1.11%
2012	123	−1.10%
2017	127	+0.64%
2023	135	+1.02%
Source: INSEE

== See also ==
- Communes of the Corrèze department
