= Saint-Cernin-de-Larche =

- Commune
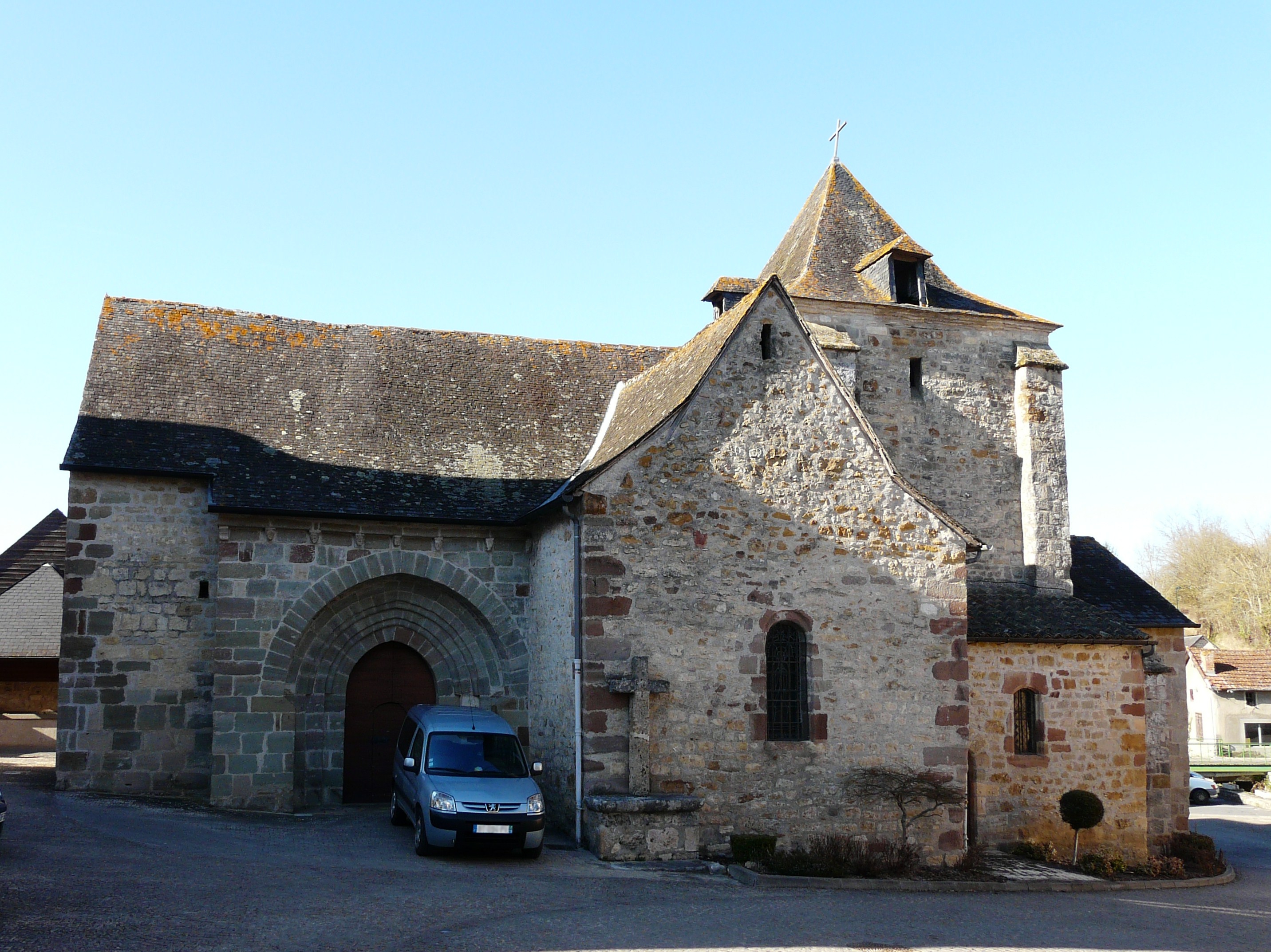
- The church in Saint-Cernin-de-Larche

- Coat of arms
- Location of Saint-Cernin-de-Larche
- Location within France Location within Nouvelle-Aquitaine
- Coordinates: 45°06′14″N 1°24′57″E
- Country: France
- Region: Nouvelle-Aquitaine
- Department: Corrèze
- Arrondissement: Brive-la-Gaillarde
- Canton: Saint-Pantaléon-de-Larche
- Intercommunality: CA Bassin de Brive

Government
  - Mayor (2020–2026): Sylvie Lorenzon
- Area^{1}: 9.15 km^{2} (3.53 sq mi)
- Elevation: 98 m (322 ft)
- Highest elevation: 312 m (1,024 ft)
- Lowest elevation: 105 m (344 ft)
- Population (2023): 695
  - Density: 76.0/km^{2} (197/sq mi)
- Time zone: UTC+01:00 (CET)
  - Summer (DST): UTC+02:00 (CEST)
- INSEE/Postal code: 19191 /19600
- ^{1} French Land Register data, which excludes lakes, ponds, glaciers > 1 km^{2} (0.386 sq mi or 247 acres) and river estuaries.

Saint-Cernin-de-Larche (French pronunciation: [sɛ̃ sɛʁnɛ̃ də laʁʃ], literally Saint-Cernin of Larche; Occitan: Sent Sarnin de l'Archa) is a commune in the Corrèze department in central France.

== Population ==
Historical population
Year	Pop.	±% p.a.
1968	309	—
1975	297	−0.56%
1982	319	+1.03%
1990	425	+3.65%
1999	456	+0.79%
2007	558	+2.56%
2012	633	+2.55%
2017	648	+0.47%
2023	695	+1.17%
Source: INSEE

== See also ==
- Communes of the Corrèze department
