= Chartrier-Ferrière =

- Commune
- Coat of arms
- Location of Chartrier-Ferrière
- Location within France Location within Nouvelle-Aquitaine
- Coordinates: 45°04′19″N 1°27′09″E
- Country: France
- Region: Nouvelle-Aquitaine
- Department: Corrèze
- Arrondissement: Brive-la-Gaillarde
- Canton: Saint-Pantaléon-de-Larche
- Intercommunality: CA Bassin de Brive

Government
  - Mayor (2020–2026): Guy Roques
- Area^{1}: 15.16 km^{2} (5.85 sq mi)
- Highest elevation: 324 m (1,063 ft)
- Lowest elevation: 231 m (758 ft)
- Population (2023): 373
  - Density: 24.6/km^{2} (63.7/sq mi)
- Time zone: UTC+01:00 (CET)
  - Summer (DST): UTC+02:00 (CEST)
- INSEE/Postal code: 19047 /19600
- ^{1} French Land Register data, which excludes lakes, ponds, glaciers > 1 km^{2} (0.386 sq mi or 247 acres) and river estuaries.

Chartrier-Ferrière (French pronunciation: [ʃaʁtʁije fɛʁjɛʁ]; Occitan: Chartrier e Ferrièra) is a commune in the Corrèze department in central France.

== Population ==
Historical population
Year	Pop.	±% p.a.
1968	223	—
1975	224	+0.06%
1982	265	+2.43%
1990	272	+0.33%
1999	275	+0.12%
2007	339	+2.65%
2012	342	+0.18%
2017	369	+1.53%
2023	373	+0.18%
Source: INSEE

== See also ==
- Communes of the Corrèze department
