= Sainte-Féréole =

- Commune
- Coat of arms
- Location of Sainte-Féréole
- Location within France Location within Nouvelle-Aquitaine
- Coordinates: 45°13′42″N 1°34′59″E
- Country: France
- Region: Nouvelle-Aquitaine
- Department: Corrèze
- Arrondissement: Brive-la-Gaillarde
- Canton: Allassac
- Intercommunality: CA Bassin de Brive

Government
  - Mayor (2020–2026): Henri Soulier
- Area^{1}: 35.3 km^{2} (13.6 sq mi)
- Highest elevation: 420 m (1,380 ft)
- Lowest elevation: 220 m (720 ft)
- Population (2023): 2,081
  - Density: 59.0/km^{2} (153/sq mi)
- Time zone: UTC+01:00 (CET)
  - Summer (DST): UTC+02:00 (CEST)
- INSEE/Postal code: 19202 /19270
- ^{1} French Land Register data, which excludes lakes, ponds, glaciers > 1 km^{2} (0.386 sq mi or 247 acres) and river estuaries.

Sainte-Féréole (French pronunciation: [sɛ̃t feʁeɔl]; Occitan: Senta Fereòla) is a commune in the Corrèze department in central France.

== Population ==
Historical population
Year	Pop.	±% p.a.
1968	1,302	—
1975	1,303	+0.01%
1982	1,449	+1.53%
1990	1,568	+0.99%
1999	1,605	+0.26%
2007	1,733	+0.96%
2012	1,824	+1.03%
2017	1,941	+1.25%
2023	2,081	+1.17%
Source: INSEE

== See also ==
- Communes of the Corrèze department
