= Canton of L'Yssandonnais =

Coordinates: 45.26°N 1.41°E

The canton of L'Yssandonnais is an administrative division of the Corrèze department, south-central France. It was created at the French canton reorganisation which came into effect in March 2015. Its seat is in Objat.

It consists of the following communes:

1. Ayen
2. Brignac-la-Plaine
3. Chabrignac
4. Concèze
5. Juillac
6. Lascaux
7. Louignac
8. Objat
9. Perpezac-le-Blanc
10. Rosiers-de-Juillac
11. Saint-Aulaire
12. Saint-Bonnet-la-Rivière
13. Saint-Cyprien
14. Saint-Cyr-la-Roche
15. Saint-Robert
16. Saint-Solve
17. Segonzac
18. Vars-sur-Roseix
19. Vignols
20. Voutezac
21. Yssandon
