= Chasteaux =

- Commune
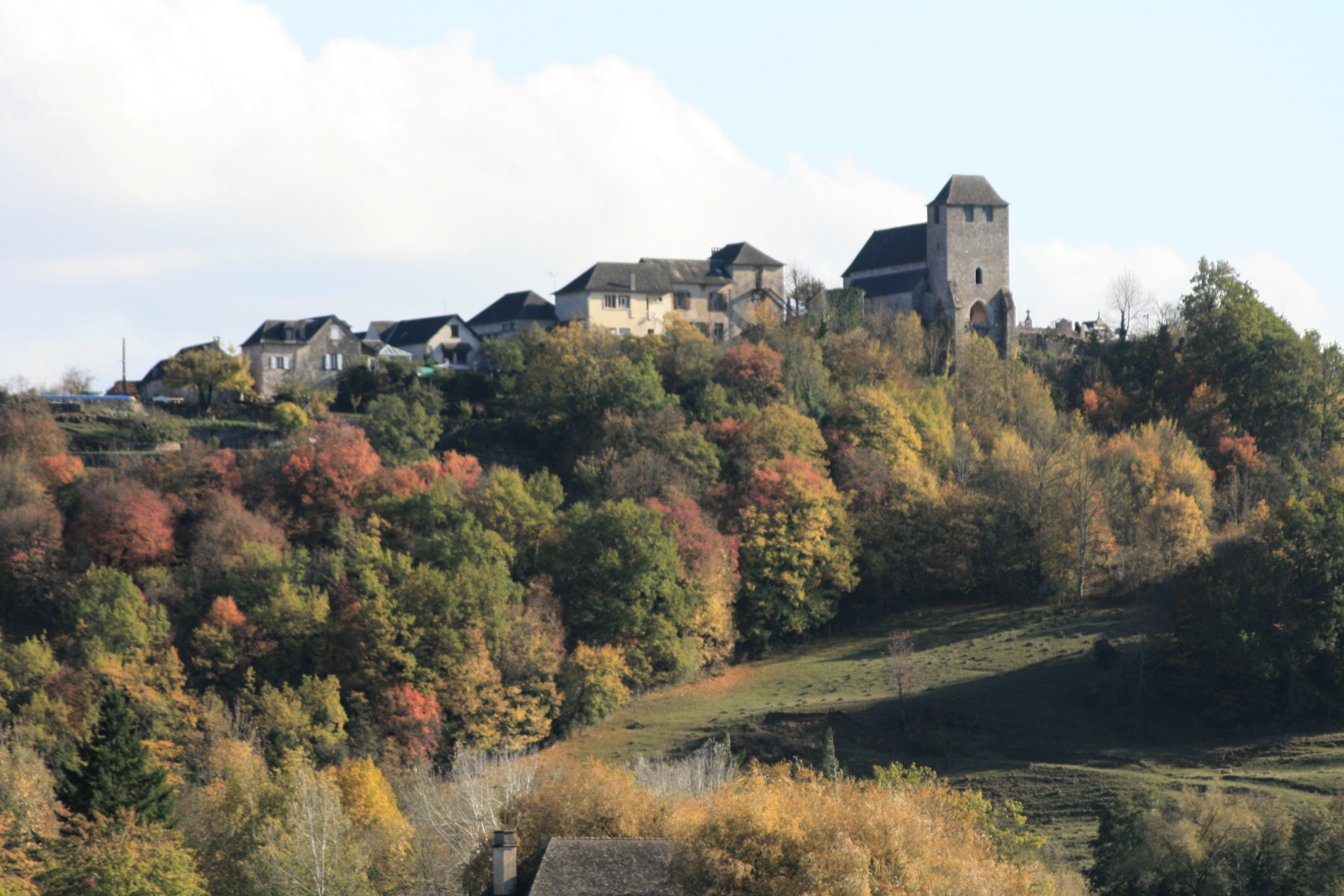
- A general view of Chasteaux

- Coat of arms
- Location of Chasteaux
- Location within France Location within Nouvelle-Aquitaine
- Coordinates: 45°05′37″N 1°28′07″E
- Country: France
- Region: Nouvelle-Aquitaine
- Department: Corrèze
- Arrondissement: Brive-la-Gaillarde
- Canton: Saint-Pantaléon-de-Larche
- Intercommunality: CA Bassin de Brive

Government
  - Mayor (2020–2026): Jean-Paul Fronty
- Area^{1}: 18.75 km^{2} (7.24 sq mi)
- Elevation: 197 m (646 ft)
- Highest elevation: 325 m (1,066 ft)
- Lowest elevation: 124 m (407 ft)
- Population (2023): 754
  - Density: 40.2/km^{2} (104/sq mi)
- Time zone: UTC+01:00 (CET)
  - Summer (DST): UTC+02:00 (CEST)
- INSEE/Postal code: 19049 /19600
- ^{1} French Land Register data, which excludes lakes, ponds, glaciers > 1 km^{2} (0.386 sq mi or 247 acres) and river estuaries.

Chasteaux (French pronunciation: [ʃasto]; Occitan: Chastel) is a commune in the Corrèze department in central France.

== Population ==
Historical population
Year	Pop.	±% p.a.
1968	413	—
1975	363	−1.83%
1982	391	+1.07%
1990	455	+1.91%
1999	512	+1.32%
2007	536	+0.57%
2012	630	+3.28%
2017	762	+3.88%
2023	754	−0.18%
Source: INSEE

== See also ==
- Communes of the Corrèze department
