= Saint-Bonnet-la-Rivière =

- Commune
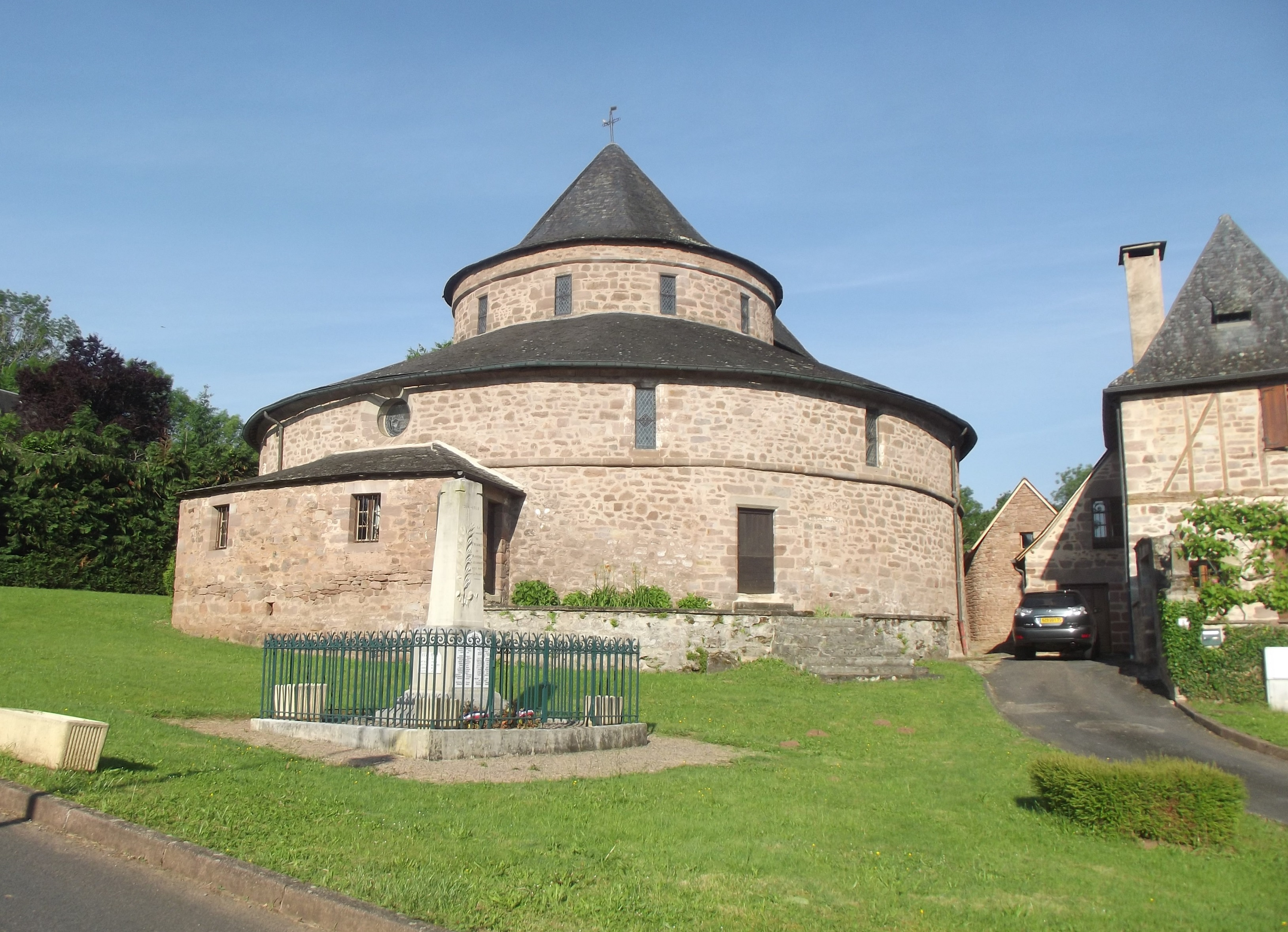
- The Church of Saint-Bonnet, in Saint-Bonnet-la-Rivière

- Coat of arms
- Location of Saint-Bonnet-la-Rivière
- Location within France Location within Nouvelle-Aquitaine
- Coordinates: 45°18′03″N 1°22′12″E
- Country: France
- Region: Nouvelle-Aquitaine
- Department: Corrèze
- Arrondissement: Brive-la-Gaillarde
- Canton: L'Yssandonnais
- Intercommunality: CA Bassin de Brive

Government
  - Mayor (2020–2026): Jean-Marie Galaud
- Area^{1}: 10.11 km^{2} (3.90 sq mi)
- Elevation: 200 m (660 ft)
- Highest elevation: 256 m (840 ft)
- Lowest elevation: 122 m (400 ft)
- Population (2023): 389
  - Density: 38.5/km^{2} (99.7/sq mi)
- Time zone: UTC+01:00 (CET)
  - Summer (DST): UTC+02:00 (CEST)
- INSEE/Postal code: 19187 /19130
- ^{1} French Land Register data, which excludes lakes, ponds, glaciers > 1 km^{2} (0.386 sq mi or 247 acres) and river estuaries.

Saint-Bonnet-la-Rivière (French pronunciation: [sɛ̃ bɔnɛ la ʁivjɛʁ]; Limousin: Sent Bonet la Ribèira) is a commune in the Corrèze department in central France.

== Population ==
Historical population
Year	Pop.	±% p.a.
1968	418	—
1975	367	−1.84%
1982	334	−1.34%
1990	327	−0.26%
1999	305	−0.77%
2007	343	+1.48%
2012	375	+1.80%
2017	387	+0.63%
2023	389	+0.09%
Source: INSEE

== See also ==
- Communes of the Corrèze department
