= Saint-Robert, Corrèze =

Saint-Robert
- Commune
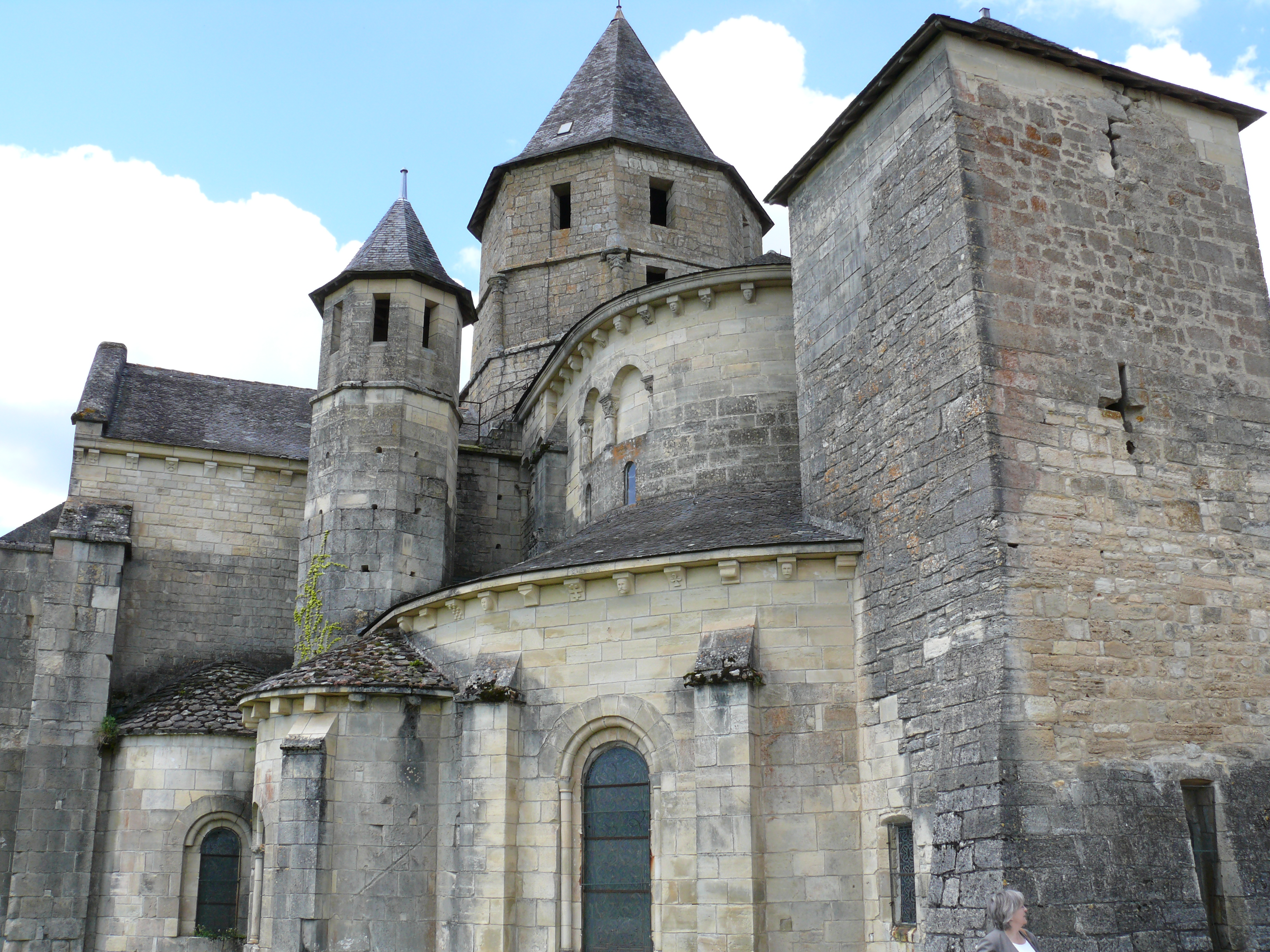
- The church in Saint-Robert

- Coat of arms
- Location of Saint-Robert
- Location within France Location within Nouvelle-Aquitaine
- Coordinates: 45°15′22″N 1°17′38″E
- Country: France
- Region: Nouvelle-Aquitaine
- Department: Corrèze
- Arrondissement: Brive-la-Gaillarde
- Canton: L'Yssandonnais
- Intercommunality: CA Bassin de Brive

Government
  - Mayor (2022–2026): Claude Achard
- Area^{1}: 6.08 km^{2} (2.35 sq mi)
- Elevation: 325 m (1,066 ft)
- Highest elevation: 354 m (1,161 ft)
- Lowest elevation: 158 m (518 ft)
- Population (2023): 294
  - Density: 48.4/km^{2} (125/sq mi)
- Time zone: UTC+01:00 (CET)
  - Summer (DST): UTC+02:00 (CEST)
- INSEE/Postal code: 19239 /19310
- ^{1} French Land Register data, which excludes lakes, ponds, glaciers > 1 km^{2} (0.386 sq mi or 247 acres) and river estuaries.

Saint-Robert (French pronunciation: [sɛ̃ ʁɔbɛʁ]; Limousin: Sent Robèrt) is a commune in the Corrèze department in central France. It is a member of Les Plus Beaux Villages de France (The Most Beautiful Villages of France) Association.

== Population ==
Historical population
Year	Pop.	±% p.a.
1968	343	—
1975	353	+0.41%
1982	371	+0.71%
1990	331	−1.42%
1999	334	+0.10%
2007	341	+0.26%
2012	333	−0.47%
2017	301	−2.00%
2023	294	−0.39%
Source: INSEE

== See also ==
- Communes of the Corrèze department
