= Chabrignac =

- Commune
- Coat of arms
- Location of Chabrignac
- Location within France Location within Nouvelle-Aquitaine
- Coordinates: 45°19′02″N 1°20′29″E
- Country: France
- Region: Nouvelle-Aquitaine
- Department: Corrèze
- Arrondissement: Brive-la-Gaillarde
- Canton: L'Yssandonnais
- Intercommunality: CA Bassin de Brive

Government
  - Mayor (2020–2026): Jean-Luc Dupuy
- Area^{1}: 11.04 km^{2} (4.26 sq mi)
- Elevation: 282 m (925 ft)
- Highest elevation: 382 m (1,253 ft)
- Lowest elevation: 136 m (446 ft)
- Population (2023): 542
  - Density: 49.1/km^{2} (127/sq mi)
- Time zone: UTC+01:00 (CET)
  - Summer (DST): UTC+02:00 (CEST)
- INSEE/Postal code: 19035 /19350
- ^{1} French Land Register data, which excludes lakes, ponds, glaciers > 1 km^{2} (0.386 sq mi or 247 acres) and river estuaries.

Chabrignac (French pronunciation: [ʃabʁiɲak]; Occitan: Chabrinhac) is a commune in the Corrèze department in central France.

== Population ==
Historical population
Year	Pop.	±% p.a.
1968	361	—
1975	364	+0.12%
1982	366	+0.08%
1990	364	−0.07%
1999	430	+1.87%
2007	499	+1.88%
2012	573	+2.80%
2017	572	−0.03%
2023	542	−0.89%
Source: INSEE

== Personalities ==
Empress Nam Phương, wife of Bảo Đại, died and is buried in Chabrignac.

== See also ==
- Communes of the Corrèze department
