= Saint-Solve =

- Commune
- Location of Saint-Solve
- Location within France Location within Nouvelle-Aquitaine
- Coordinates: 45°18′39″N 1°24′05″E
- Country: France
- Region: Nouvelle-Aquitaine
- Department: Corrèze
- Arrondissement: Brive-la-Gaillarde
- Canton: L'Yssandonnais
- Intercommunality: CA Bassin de Brive

Government
  - Mayor (2020–2026): Daniel Freygefond
- Area^{1}: 5.84 km^{2} (2.25 sq mi)
- Elevation: 245 m (804 ft)
- Highest elevation: 366 m (1,201 ft)
- Lowest elevation: 126 m (413 ft)
- Population (2023): 450
  - Density: 77/km^{2} (200/sq mi)
- Time zone: UTC+01:00 (CET)
  - Summer (DST): UTC+02:00 (CEST)
- INSEE/Postal code: 19242 /19130
- ^{1} French Land Register data, which excludes lakes, ponds, glaciers > 1 km^{2} (0.386 sq mi or 247 acres) and river estuaries.

Saint-Solve (French pronunciation: [sɛ̃ sɔlv]; Occitan: Sent Sòlve) is a commune in the Corrèze department in central France. Vignols-Saint-Solve station has rail connections to Brive-la-Gaillarde, Saint-Yrieix and Limoges.

== Population ==
Historical population
Year	Pop.	±% p.a.
1968	324	—
1975	312	−0.54%
1982	282	−1.43%
1990	323	+1.71%
1999	326	+0.10%
2007	387	+2.17%
2012	428	+2.03%
2017	460	+1.45%
2023	450	−0.37%
Source: INSEE

== See also ==
- Communes of the Corrèze department
