= Perpezac-le-Blanc =

- Commune
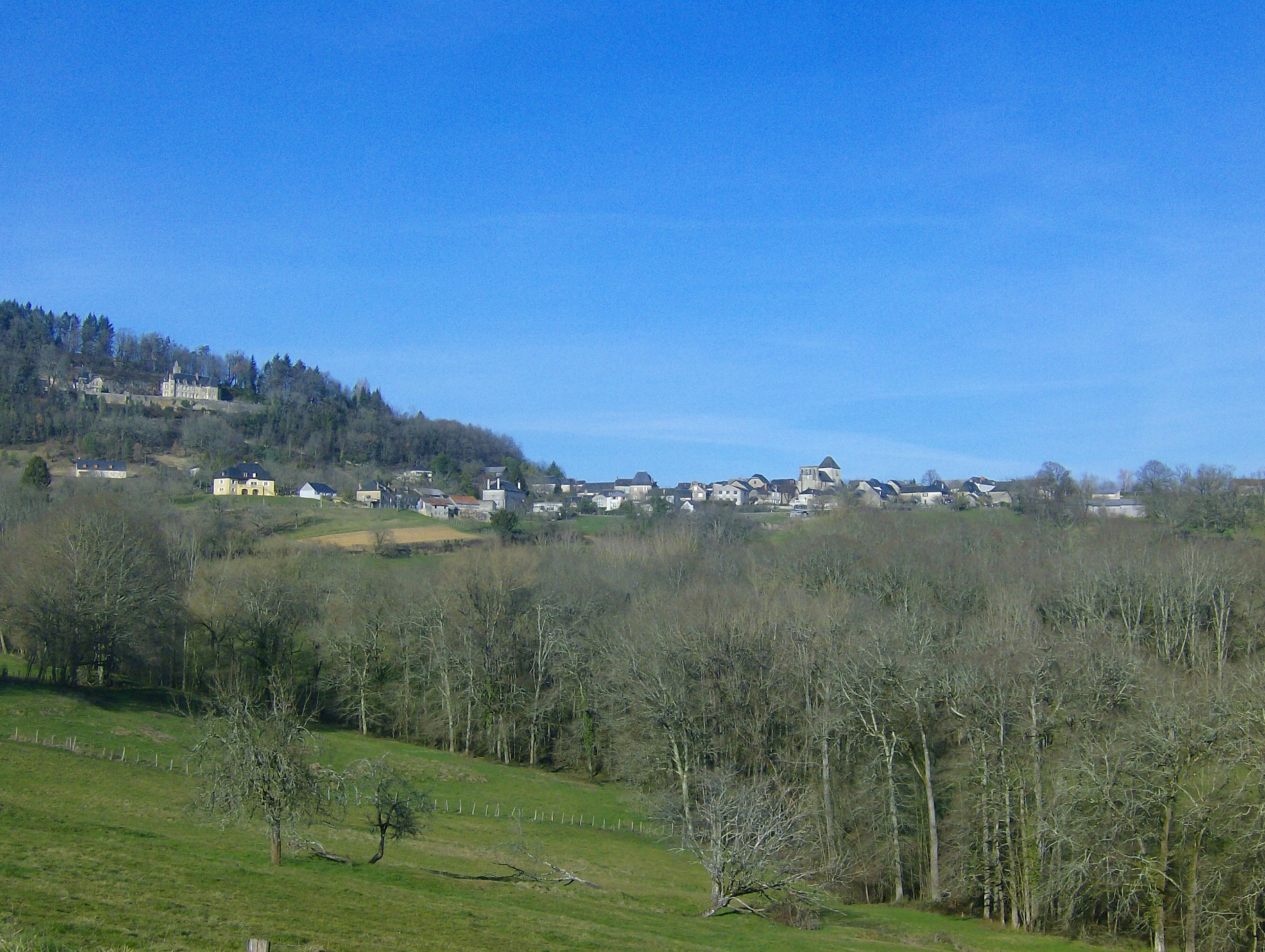
- A general view of Perpezac-le-Blanc

- Coat of arms
- Location of Perpezac-le-Blanc
- Location within France Location within Nouvelle-Aquitaine
- Coordinates: 45°13′23″N 1°19′58″E
- Country: France
- Region: Nouvelle-Aquitaine
- Department: Corrèze
- Arrondissement: Brive-la-Gaillarde
- Canton: L'Yssandonnais
- Intercommunality: CA Bassin de Brive

Government
  - Mayor (2020–2026): Sandrine Labrousse
- Area^{1}: 19.42 km^{2} (7.50 sq mi)
- Elevation: 320 m (1,050 ft)
- Highest elevation: 363 m (1,191 ft)
- Lowest elevation: 119 m (390 ft)
- Population (2023): 427
  - Density: 22.0/km^{2} (56.9/sq mi)
- Time zone: UTC+01:00 (CET)
  - Summer (DST): UTC+02:00 (CEST)
- INSEE/Postal code: 19161 /19310
- ^{1} French Land Register data, which excludes lakes, ponds, glaciers > 1 km^{2} (0.386 sq mi or 247 acres) and river estuaries.

Perpezac-le-Blanc (French pronunciation: [pɛʁpəzak lə blɑ̃]; Occitan: Perpesac lo Blanc) is a commune in the Corrèze department in central France.

== Population ==
Historical population
Year	Pop.	±% p.a.
1968	536	—
1975	437	−2.88%
1982	424	−0.43%
1990	404	−0.60%
1999	405	+0.03%
2007	445	+1.18%
2012	475	+1.31%
2017	468	−0.30%
2023	427	−1.52%
Source: INSEE

== See also ==
- Communes of the Corrèze department
