= Cublac =

- Commune
- Coat of arms
- Location of Cublac
- Location within France Location within Nouvelle-Aquitaine
- Coordinates: 45°08′49″N 1°18′19″E
- Country: France
- Region: Nouvelle-Aquitaine
- Department: Corrèze
- Arrondissement: Brive-la-Gaillarde
- Canton: Saint-Pantaléon-de-Larche
- Intercommunality: CA Bassin de Brive

Government
  - Mayor (2020–2026): Jean-Marc Brut
- Area^{1}: 20.18 km^{2} (7.79 sq mi)
- Elevation: 300 m (980 ft)
- Highest elevation: 326 m (1,070 ft)
- Lowest elevation: 88 m (289 ft)
- Population (2023): 1,728
  - Density: 85.63/km^{2} (221.8/sq mi)
- Time zone: UTC+01:00 (CET)
  - Summer (DST): UTC+02:00 (CEST)
- INSEE/Postal code: 19066 /19520
- ^{1} French Land Register data, which excludes lakes, ponds, glaciers > 1 km^{2} (0.386 sq mi or 247 acres) and river estuaries.

Cublac (French pronunciation: [kyblak]) is a commune in the Corrèze department in central France.

== Population ==
Historical population
Year	Pop.	±% p.a.
1968	1,062	—
1975	1,132	+0.92%
1982	1,377	+2.84%
1990	1,560	+1.57%
1999	1,515	−0.32%
2007	1,622	+0.86%
2012	1,722	+1.20%
2017	1,695	−0.32%
2023	1,728	+0.32%
Source: INSEE

== See also ==
- Communes of the Corrèze department
