= Canton of Malemort =

Coordinates: 45.17°N 1.56°E

The canton of Malemort (before March 2020: Malemort-sur-Corrèze) is an administrative division of the Corrèze department, south-central France. Its borders were modified at the French canton reorganisation which came into effect in March 2015. Its seat is in Malemort.

It consists of the following communes:

1. Dampniat
2. Malemort
3. Ussac
4. Varetz
