= Rosiers-de-Juillac =

- Commune
- Coat of arms
- Location of Rosiers-de-Juillac
- Location within France Location within Nouvelle-Aquitaine
- Coordinates: 45°17′43″N 1°18′12″E
- Country: France
- Region: Nouvelle-Aquitaine
- Department: Corrèze
- Arrondissement: Brive-la-Gaillarde
- Canton: L'Yssandonnais
- Intercommunality: CA Bassin de Brive

Government
  - Mayor (2020–2026): Céline Gaul
- Area^{1}: 9.85 km^{2} (3.80 sq mi)
- Elevation: 140 m (460 ft)
- Highest elevation: 273 m (896 ft)
- Lowest elevation: 135 m (443 ft)
- Population (2023): 177
  - Density: 18.0/km^{2} (46.5/sq mi)
- Time zone: UTC+01:00 (CET)
  - Summer (DST): UTC+02:00 (CEST)
- INSEE/Postal code: 19177 /19350
- ^{1} French Land Register data, which excludes lakes, ponds, glaciers > 1 km^{2} (0.386 sq mi or 247 acres) and river estuaries.

Rosiers-de-Juillac (French pronunciation: [ʁozje də ʒɥijak], literally Rosiers of Juillac; Occitan: Rosier de Julhac) is a commune in the Corrèze department in central France.

== Population ==
Historical population
Year	Pop.	±% p.a.
1968	232	—
1975	208	−1.55%
1982	205	−0.21%
1990	200	−0.31%
1999	194	−0.34%
2007	184	−0.66%
2012	189	+0.54%
2017	181	−0.86%
2023	177	−0.37%
Source: INSEE

== See also ==
- Communes of the Corrèze department
