= Saint-Sornin-Lavolps =

- Commune
- Coat of arms
- Location of Saint-Sornin-Lavolps
- Location within France Location within Nouvelle-Aquitaine
- Coordinates: 45°22′44″N 1°23′01″E
- Country: France
- Region: Nouvelle-Aquitaine
- Department: Corrèze
- Arrondissement: Brive-la-Gaillarde
- Canton: Uzerche

Government
  - Mayor (2020–2026): Éric Lascaux
- Area^{1}: 15.36 km^{2} (5.93 sq mi)
- Elevation: 400 m (1,300 ft)
- Highest elevation: 464 m (1,522 ft)
- Lowest elevation: 289 m (948 ft)
- Population (2023): 847
  - Density: 55.1/km^{2} (143/sq mi)
- Time zone: UTC+01:00 (CET)
  - Summer (DST): UTC+02:00 (CEST)
- INSEE/Postal code: 19243 /19230
- ^{1} French Land Register data, which excludes lakes, ponds, glaciers > 1 km^{2} (0.386 sq mi or 247 acres) and river estuaries.

Saint-Sornin-Lavolps (French pronunciation: [sɛ̃ sɔʁnɛ̃ lavo]; Occitan: Sent Sarnin las Volps) is a commune in the Corrèze department in central France.

== Population ==
Historical population
Year	Pop.	±% p.a.
1968	850	—
1975	935	+1.37%
1982	940	+0.08%
1990	946	+0.08%
1999	956	+0.12%
2007	928	−0.37%
2012	895	−0.72%
2017	858	−0.84%
2023	847	−0.21%
Source: INSEE

== See also ==
- Communes of the Corrèze department
