= Louignac =

- Commune
- Coat of arms
- Location of Louignac
- Location within France Location within Nouvelle-Aquitaine
- Coordinates: 45°13′42″N 1°16′53″E
- Country: France
- Region: Nouvelle-Aquitaine
- Department: Corrèze
- Arrondissement: Brive-la-Gaillarde
- Canton: L'Yssandonnais
- Intercommunality: CA Bassin de Brive

Government
  - Mayor (2020–2026): Régis Lescure
- Area^{1}: 21.91 km^{2} (8.46 sq mi)
- Highest elevation: 314 m (1,030 ft)
- Lowest elevation: 145 m (476 ft)
- Population (2023): 248
  - Density: 11.3/km^{2} (29.3/sq mi)
- Time zone: UTC+01:00 (CET)
  - Summer (DST): UTC+02:00 (CEST)
- INSEE/Postal code: 19120 /19310
- ^{1} French Land Register data, which excludes lakes, ponds, glaciers > 1 km^{2} (0.386 sq mi or 247 acres) and river estuaries.

Louignac (French pronunciation: [lwiɲak]; Occitan: Lonhac) is a commune in the Corrèze department in central France.

== Population ==
Historical population
Year	Pop.	±% p.a.
1968	266	—
1975	246	−1.11%
1982	208	−2.37%
1990	194	−0.87%
1999	186	−0.47%
2007	228	+2.58%
2012	222	−0.53%
2017	236	+1.23%
2023	248	+0.83%
Source: INSEE

== See also ==
- Communes of the Corrèze department
