= Saint-Cyr-la-Roche =

- Commune
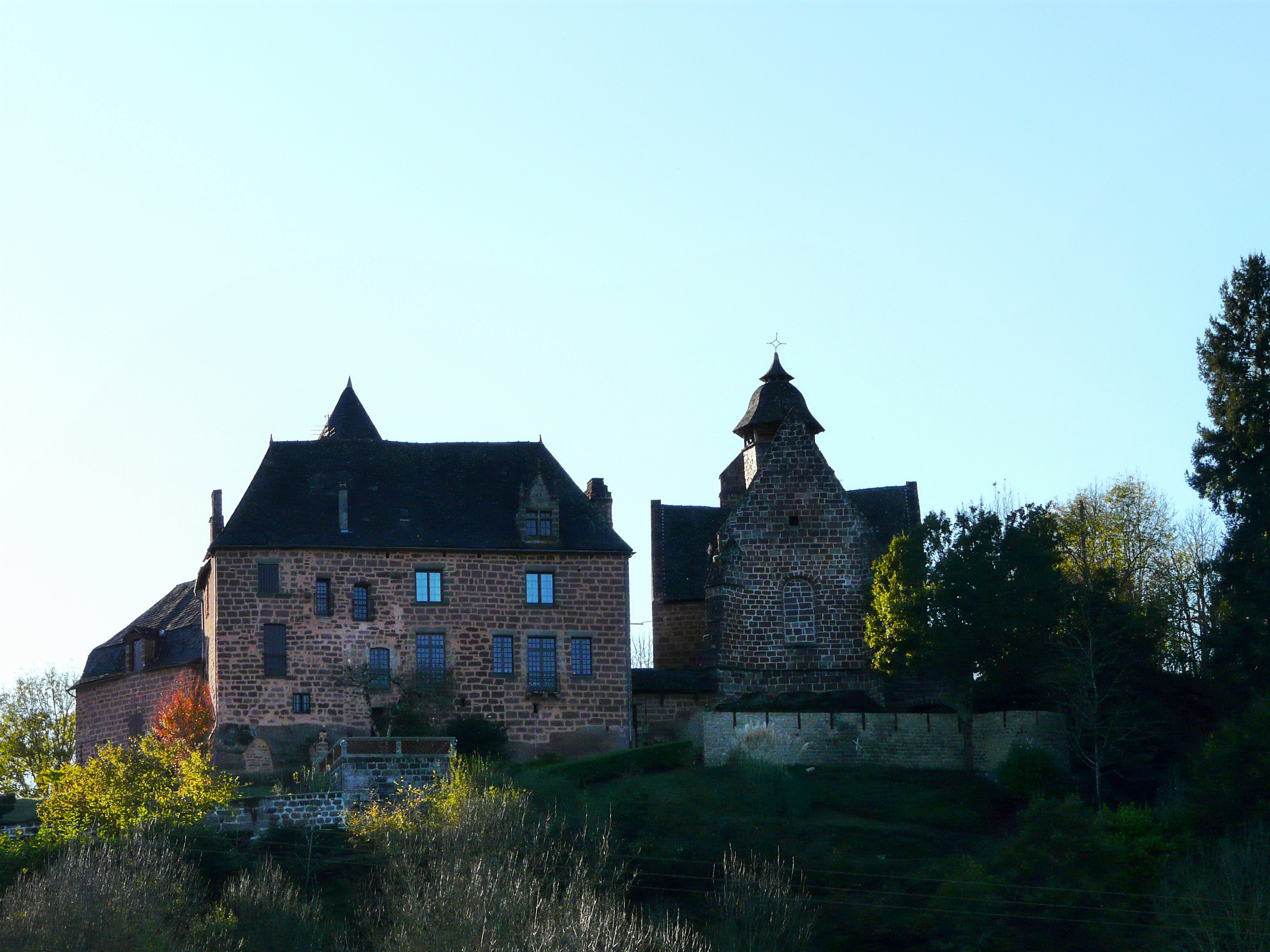
- The manor and the church

- Coat of arms
- Location of Saint-Cyr-la-Roche
- Location within France Location within Nouvelle-Aquitaine
- Coordinates: 45°16′20″N 1°23′30″E
- Country: France
- Region: Nouvelle-Aquitaine
- Department: Corrèze
- Arrondissement: Brive-la-Gaillarde
- Canton: L'Yssandonnais
- Intercommunality: CA Bassin de Brive

Government
  - Mayor (2020–2026): Nelly Duffaut
- Area^{1}: 8.24 km^{2} (3.18 sq mi)
- Elevation: 185 m (607 ft)
- Highest elevation: 229 m (751 ft)
- Lowest elevation: 112 m (367 ft)
- Population (2023): 450
  - Density: 55/km^{2} (140/sq mi)
- Time zone: UTC+01:00 (CET)
  - Summer (DST): UTC+02:00 (CEST)
- INSEE/Postal code: 19196 /19130
- ^{1} French Land Register data, which excludes lakes, ponds, glaciers > 1 km^{2} (0.386 sq mi or 247 acres) and river estuaries.

Saint-Cyr-la-Roche (French pronunciation: [sɛ̃ siʁ la ʁɔʃ]; Occitan: Sent Cir la Ròcha) is a commune in the Corrèze department in central France.

== Population ==
Historical population
| Year | Pop. | ±% p.a. |
|---|---|---|
| 1968 | 290 | — |
| 1975 | 296 | +0.29% |
| 1982 | 288 | −0.39% |
| 1990 | 276 | −0.53% |
| 1999 | 326 | +1.87% |
| 2007 | 417 | +3.13% |
| 2012 | 482 | +2.94% |
| 2017 | 505 | +0.94% |
| 2023 | 450 | −1.90% |
Source: INSEE

== See also ==
- Communes of the Corrèze department
