= Marbot =

Marbot (English: /mɑːrˈboʊ/, French: [maʁbo]) may refer to:

== People ==
Marbot family members, including:

- Jean-Antoine Marbot (1754–1800), French general and politician
- Adolphe Marbot (1781–1844), French general
- Marcellin Marbot (1782–1854), French general

== Literature ==
- Mémoires du Général Baron de Marbot, an 1891 autobiography by Marcellin Marbot
- Sir Andrew Marbot, a 1981 historical fiction novel by Wolfgang Hildesheimer

== Places ==
France:

- Avenue des Généraux Marbot, an avenue in Altillac
- Hôtel Marbot, a château in Tulle, seat of the departmental council of Corrèze
- Place Marbot, a square in Beaulieu-sur-Dordogne

Canada:

- Marbot Lake, a lake in Eeyou Istchee James Bay

== Other uses ==
- A walnut cultivar
