= Antoine Marbot =

Antoine Marbot (English: /ænˈtwɑːn mɑːrˈboʊ/, French: [ɑ̃twan maʁbo]) may refer to:

- Jean-Antoine Marbot (1754–1800), French general and politician
- Antoine Adolphe Marcelin Marbot (1781–1844), French general
