= General Marbot =

General Marbot (English: /mɑːrˈboʊ/, French: [maʁbo]) may refer to:

- Jean-Antoine Marbot (1754–1800), French general and politician
- Adolphe Marbot (1781–1844), French general
- Marcellin Marbot (1782–1854), French general
