= Astaillac =

- Commune
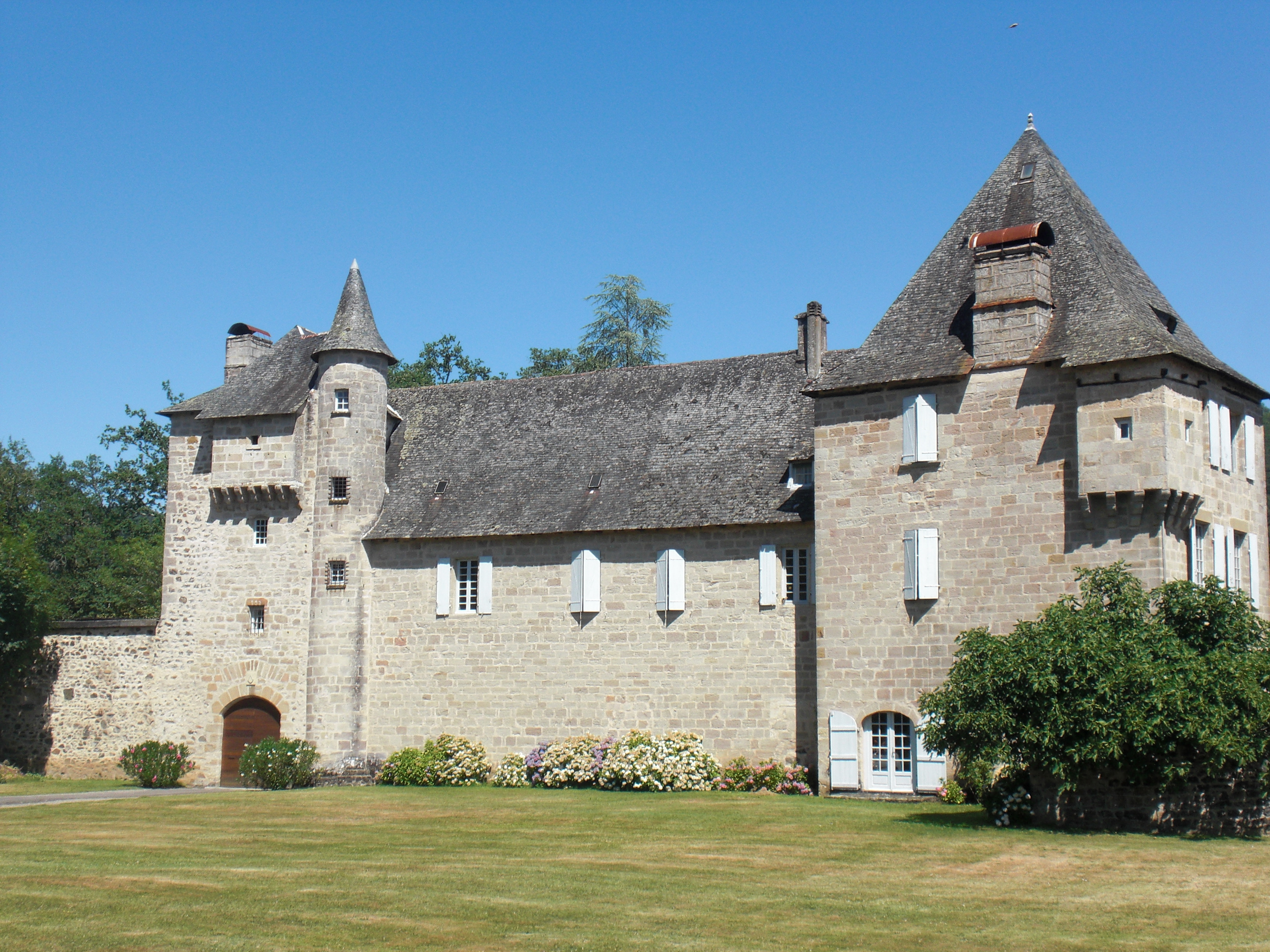
- The Chateau of Estresse

- Coat of arms
- Location of Astaillac
- Location within France Location within Nouvelle-Aquitaine
- Coordinates: 44°57′09″N 1°49′56″E
- Country: France
- Region: Nouvelle-Aquitaine
- Department: Corrèze
- Arrondissement: Brive-la-Gaillarde
- Canton: Midi Corrézien
- Intercommunality: CC Midi Corrézien

Government
  - Mayor (2020–2026): Bernard Reynal
- Area^{1}: 7.35 km^{2} (2.84 sq mi)
- Elevation: 202 m (663 ft)
- Highest elevation: 306 m (1,004 ft)
- Lowest elevation: 128 m (420 ft)
- Population (2023): 204
  - Density: 27.8/km^{2} (71.9/sq mi)
- Time zone: UTC+01:00 (CET)
  - Summer (DST): UTC+02:00 (CEST)
- INSEE/Postal code: 19012 /19120
- ^{1} French Land Register data, which excludes lakes, ponds, glaciers > 1 km^{2} (0.386 sq mi or 247 acres) and river estuaries.

Astaillac (French pronunciation: [astajak]; Occitan: Astalhac) is a commune in the Corrèze department in the Nouvelle-Aquitaine region of central France.

== Toponymy ==
There are two possibilities for the origin of the commune's name and both originate as a person's name who owned the area. As a Gallo-Roman domain of Astilus a Latin name and -iacum, the possession of Astilusiacum. Another theory is that it originates as Stalliacus, the domain of Stallius in the vicaria of Ascanensi (Puy-d'Arnac).

The village name changed over the centuries, Astaliaco (860), Staliacus (882), Astilico (917), Astiliaco (10th), Astalhac (1315), and Estailhat (1687).

== History ==
In 860, Rodolphe of Turenne, Archbishop of Bourges, donated Astaillac, its church and lands to the monastery he founded at Beaulieu sur Dordogne. Initially the domain of the Benedictine order, in 1072 Pope Urban II donated it to the Abbey of Cluny when the Abbey of Beaulieu was brought under the latter's control.

An old chateau used to stand where the old school is situated. It was attacked several times in the past, first in 1250 by the people of Beaulieu, by the Baron of Castelnau in the 1300s with eighty people killed, and by Protestants in 1575. After the French Revolution, the lands of the Duchamp de la Geneste were sold off to the communes' people.

== Geography ==
Astaillac is located some 45 km south-east of Brive-la-Gaillarde and 15 km north by north-west of Saint-Céré. The eastern border of the commune is also the border between the departments of Corrèze and Lot. Access to the commune is by the D41 road from Beaulieu-sur-Dordogne in the north passing through the east of the commune and continuing south-west to Liourdres. The D41E1 comes from the D153E south-west of Sioniac through the commune to the village and continues to the hamlet of La Plaine. Apart from the village there are the hamlets of Conques, Le Soulie, La Plaine, and Cassagne. The commune is mixed forest and farmland.

The Dordogne river forms the eastern border of the commune except for a small area on the left bank which forms part of the commune. The Dordogne flows south and eventually joins the Garonne at Saint-Seurin-de-Bourg. Several streams rise in the commune and flow south-east to join the Dordogne: the Ruisseau de Ganissal, the Ruisseau de Fontanille, the Ruisseau de Laborie, and the Ruisseau de Coucoulogne which forms the western border of the commune.

=== Heraldry ===
Arms of Astaillac	The official status of the blazon remains to be determined Blazon: Azure, a chevron lopped of Or between 3 roquets the same.

== Administration ==
List of Successive Mayors

From	To	Name
2001	2008	Pierre Gaubet
2008	2012	Nicole Lescure
2012	2026	Bernard Reynal

== Demography ==
The inhabitants of the commune are known as Astaillacois or Astaillacoises in French.

Historical population

Year	Pop.	±% p.a.
1793	564	—
1821	722	+0.89%
1846	658	−0.37%
1872	670	+0.07%
1901	507	−0.96%
1926	402	−0.92%
1946	334	−0.92%
1962	270	−1.32%
1968	276	+0.37%

Year	Pop.	±% p.a.
1975	250	−1.40%
1982	258	+0.45%
1990	225	−1.70%
1999	220	−0.25%
2007	219	−0.06%
2012	220	+0.09%
2017	232	+1.07%
2023	204	−2.12%

Source: EHESS and INSEE

== Sites and monuments ==
- The Chateau of Estresse (15th century) is registered as a historical monument.
- The Parish Church of Saint-Etienne contains a Bronze Bell (1571) which is registered as a historical object.

== See also ==
- Communes of the Corrèze department
