= Altillac =

- Commune
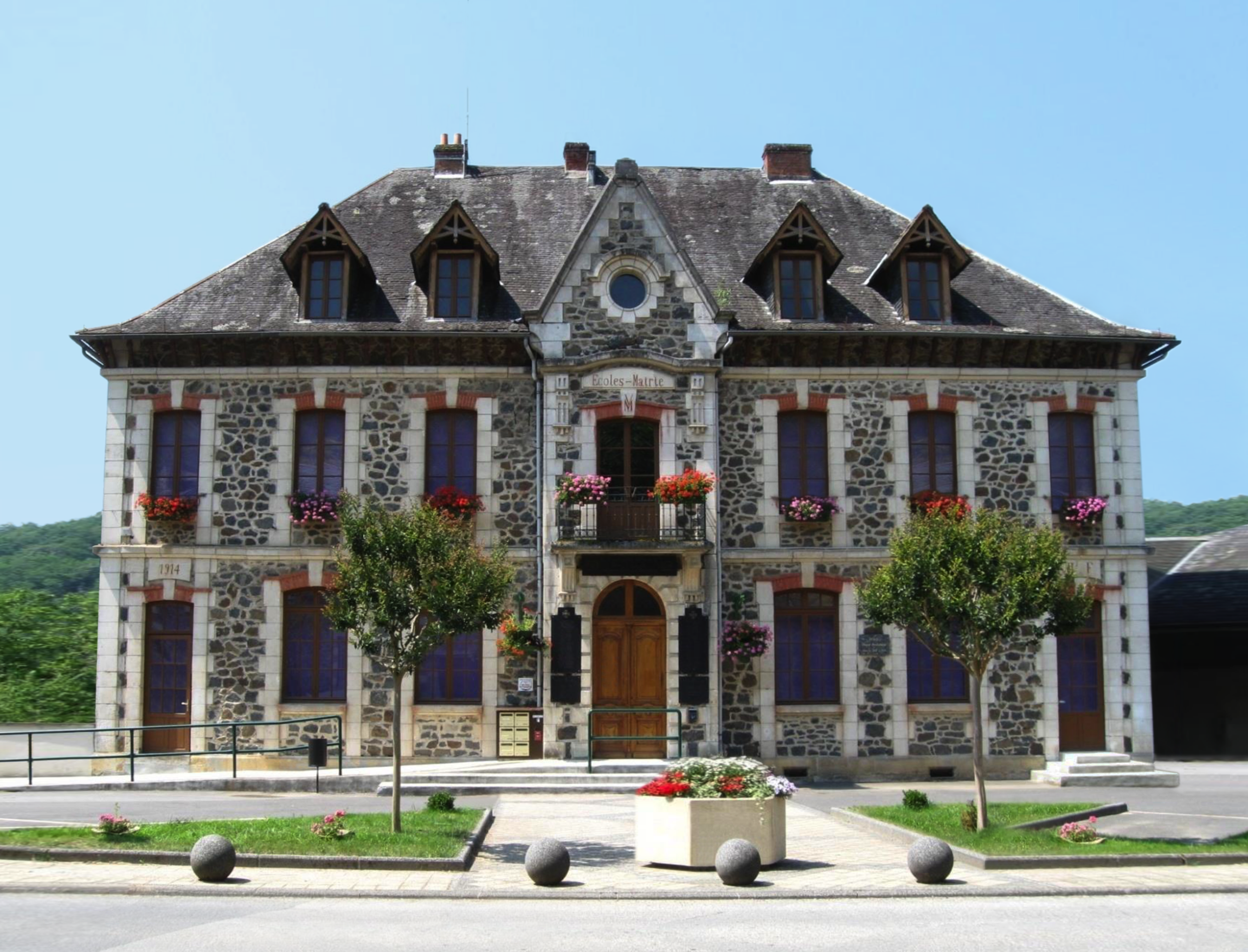
- The Town Hall of Altillac

- Coat of arms
- Location of Altillac
- Location within France Location within Nouvelle-Aquitaine
- Coordinates: 44°58′40″N 1°50′48″E
- Country: France
- Region: Nouvelle-Aquitaine
- Department: Corrèze
- Arrondissement: Brive-la-Gaillarde
- Canton: Midi Corrézien
- Intercommunality: Midi Corrézien

Government
  - Mayor (2020–2026): Denis Pinsac
- Area^{1}: 25.23 km^{2} (9.74 sq mi)
- Elevation: 146 m (479 ft)
- Highest elevation: 502 m (1,647 ft)
- Lowest elevation: 136 m (446 ft)
- Population (2023): 824
  - Density: 32.7/km^{2} (84.6/sq mi)
- Time zone: UTC+01:00 (CET)
  - Summer (DST): UTC+02:00 (CEST)
- INSEE/Postal code: 19007 /19120
- ^{1} French Land Register data, which excludes lakes, ponds, glaciers > 1 km^{2} (0.386 sq mi or 247 acres) and river estuaries.

Altillac (French pronunciation: [altijak]; Occitan: Altilhac) is a commune in the Corrèze department in the Nouvelle-Aquitaine region of central France.

== History ==
Altillac was the seat of a Viguerie under the Carolingian dynasty.The village's first written mention is in the cartulary of the monastery at Beaulieu-sur-Dordogne but people had existed in the area since the Neolithic period attested to by the existence of dolmens in the commune.

On 28 May 1942, the regional prefect of Limoges requisitioned land from the Chateau of Doux to create an internment centre for Jewish families.

=== Heraldry ===
Arms of Altillac	The official status of the blazon remains to be determined. Blazon: Azure, a wolf rampant of Or bordure engrailed in gules, in chief the same charged with three mullets of Or.

== Geography ==
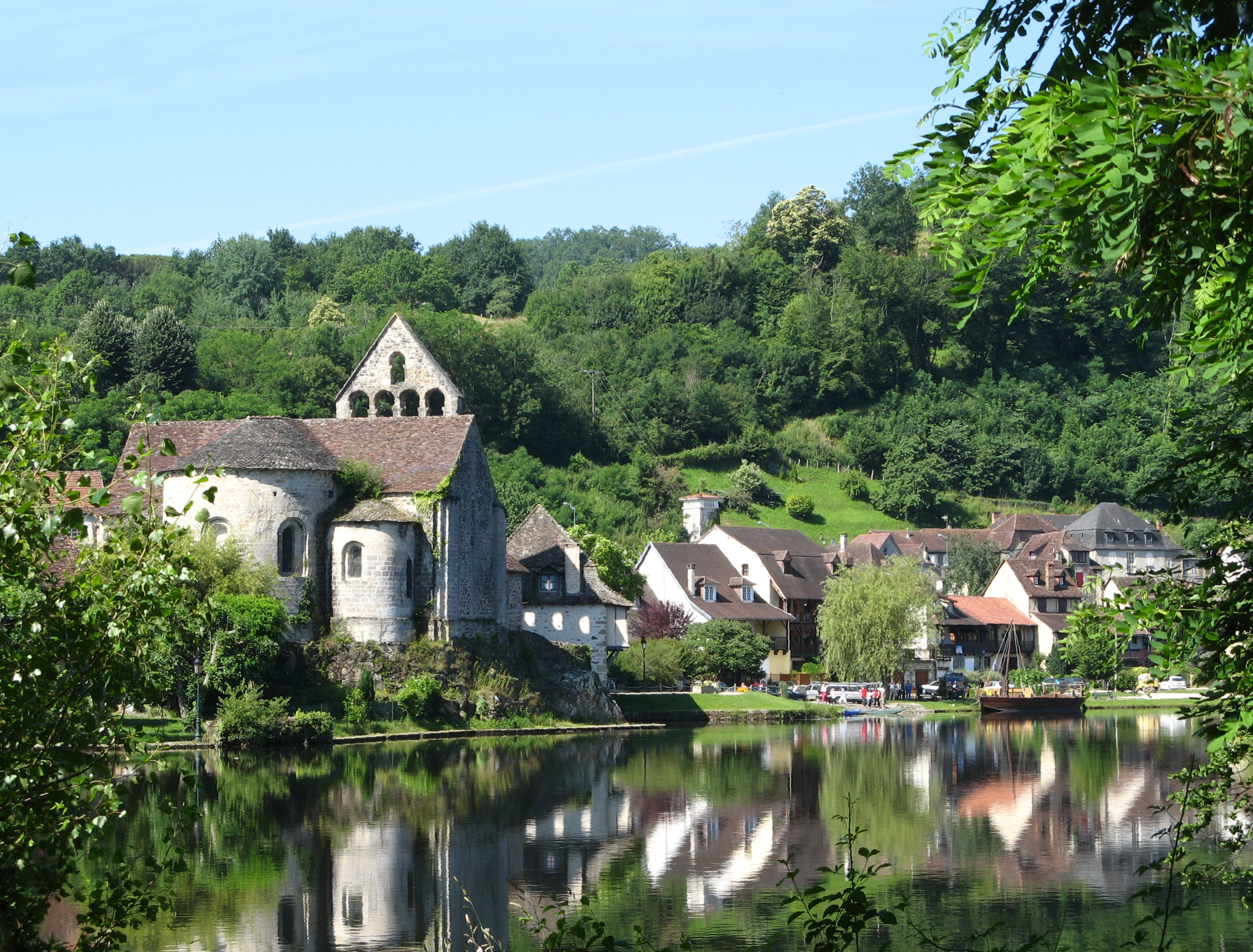
View of Beaulieu-sur-Dordogne across the river from Altillac

Altillac is a large commune located in the central massif of the Dordogne in eastern Nouvelle-Aquitaine (previously the smaller Limousin region until 2016), almost on the border with Occitania (previously Midi-Pyrénées). It was formerly called Xaintrie.

It is located some 30 km south-east of Brive-la-Gaillarde, 130 km south-west of Clermont-Ferrand, and about 180 km east of Bordeaux. Access to the commune is on road D940 which goes to the village just 1 km east of Beaulieu-sur-Dordogne then continues south through the commune to Biars-sur-Cère. The D116E branches south-east from this road to join the D14 east of Gagnac-sur-Cère. There is also the D116 coming from Brivezac in the north and the D41 highway to La Chapelle-Saint-Géraud in the north-east.

The Dordogne river forms the western boundary of the commune with some streams from the commune flowing into it including the Ruisseau du Suquet. The eastern border of the commune is formed by the Ruisseau d'Orges which flows south into the Ceres river. The northern border is formed by the Ruisseau de Chauvac which flows west into the Dordogne. The Ruisseau de Laumond on the eastern side also flows east into the Orges as does the Ruisseau de Malaval in the south.

There are quite a number of villages and hamlets in the commune. These are:

- Andole
- Courbignac
- Esclaux
- Fontmerle
- Freyssignes
- Gramond
- Guilles
- L'Aumond
- L'Aussac
- La Borderie
- La Bourelle
- La Majorie
- La Palide
- La Poujade
- La Poulvélarie
- La Veyssière
- Le Rodal
- Le Sagrier
- Le Treil
- Les Escures
- Paliole
- Siran

== Population ==
The inhabitants of the commune are known as Altillacois or Altillacoises in French.

Historical population
Year	Pop.	±% p.a.
1968	762	—
1975	720	−0.81%
1982	791	+1.35%
1990	824	+0.51%
1999	801	−0.31%
2007	844	+0.66%
2012	868	+0.56%
2017	861	−0.16%
2023	824	−0.73%
Source: INSEE

== Local government ==
List of Successive Mayors of Altillac:

From	To	Name
1808	1834	Antoine Dauvis Bichiran
1834	1837	Jean Frédéric Bichiran
1837	1878	Jean Joseph Fontanille
1878	1883	Jean Baptiste Victor Borie
1883	1884	Joseph Lebrun
1884	1885	Jules d'Humières
1885	1888	Jules Argueyrolles
1888	1904	Philippe Dounier
1904	1908	Louis Lamond
1908	1919	Jean Versejoux
1919	1934	Ernest Faugère
1934	1944	Georges Mas
1944	1945	Romain Conche
1945	1958	Georges Mas
1958	1977	Romain Conche
1977	1983	Robert Audrerie
1983	1995	Pierre Poulvélarie
1995	2001	Jean-Claude Vergne
2001	2020	Robert Vialard
2020	2026	Denis Pinsac

== Culture and heritage ==
=== Civil heritage ===
- The Chateau du Doux was built in 1904-1906 from plans by Jean-Louis Pascal. Influenced by the style used in Deauville, it is built in the style of Xaintrie, the nearest town, to serve as a luxury hotel. It is built above a valley and offers views of the surrounding landscape. Different styles are used for the window frames: simple windows, large curved bayss with stone latticework, cross windows, skylights, and capucine passantes. It used local materials to allow it to have a regional air: stones of various colours and a slate roof. Inside, the woodwork is Art Nouveau.
- On the other side of the valley is the Doux domain where large farm buildings have been built: huge barns/stables on two levels with many barns built in imitation of small farms, which form a semblance of a hamlet, a henhouse, and a bread oven. All buildings - the hotel and the farm buildings - are certified as heritage of the 20th century.
- The Dolmen de la Borderie - a Neolithic Dolmen in good condition.
- The Dolmen de Peyre-Levade
- Other chateaus are at Miegemont, la Majorie (dating from 1800s and on an old castrum), Bra (rectangular building with two towers), Vaurs (1900), Sugarde, Bichiran, and Gary.

=== Religious heritage ===
- The Church of Saint-Etienne (14th century) is registered as an historical monument. It was built in 1528 except for the bell tower which dates back to the 14th century. The Church contains several items that are registered as historical objects:
  - A set of Baptismal fonts
  - Covers for the Baptismal fonts (1700)
  - Bowls for the Baptismal fonts (12th century)
  - The panelling in the Choir (1676)
  - 6 Bas-reliefs (1676)
  - The panelling on the walls (1676)
- Devotional fountain dedicated to Saint-Estèphe from 1385.

== Personalities ==
Notable personalities linked to the commune include:

- Jean-Antoine Marbot, born 7 December 1754 in Altillac – 19 April 1800: French divisional general and politician. Father of generals Adolphe and Marcellin Marbot.
- Adolphe Marbot, born 22 March 1781 in Altillac – 2 June 1844: French maréchal de camp (brigadier general).
- Marcellin Marbot, born 18 August 1782 in Altillac – 16 November 1854: French lieutenant-général (divisional general), author of the famous Memoirs of General Marbot.
- Marcel Conche, born 27 March 1922 in Altillac – 27 February 2022: French philosopher and professor emeritus of philosophy at the Sorbonne.

== See also ==
- Communes of the Corrèze department
