= Liourdres =

- Commune
- Coat of arms
- Location of Liourdres
- Location within France Location within Nouvelle-Aquitaine
- Coordinates: 44°55′52″N 1°48′42″E
- Country: France
- Region: Nouvelle-Aquitaine
- Department: Corrèze
- Arrondissement: Brive-la-Gaillarde
- Canton: Midi Corrézien

Government
  - Mayor (2020–2026): Yves Noyer
- Area^{1}: 5.91 km^{2} (2.28 sq mi)
- Highest elevation: 280 m (920 ft)
- Lowest elevation: 129 m (423 ft)
- Population (2023): 271
  - Density: 45.9/km^{2} (119/sq mi)
- Time zone: UTC+01:00 (CET)
  - Summer (DST): UTC+02:00 (CEST)
- INSEE/Postal code: 19116 /19120
- ^{1} French Land Register data, which excludes lakes, ponds, glaciers > 1 km^{2} (0.386 sq mi or 247 acres) and river estuaries.

Liourdres (French pronunciation: [ljuʁdʁ]; Occitan: Liordres) is a commune in the Corrèze department in central France.

== Toponymy ==
In 868, Liourdres was documented as villa or rural estate called Lusidus. It was situated in the Viscounty of Turenne. During the 1600's it became a fief of the lords of d'Estresse in Astaillac.

== Demographics ==
Historical population
Year	Pop.	±% p.a.
1968	266	—
1975	253	−0.71%
1982	224	−1.72%
1990	205	−1.10%
1999	182	−1.31%
2007	208	+1.68%
2012	243	+3.16%
2017	248	+0.41%
2023	271	+1.49%
Source: INSEE

== Places and monuments ==
- Église Saint-Clair de Liourdres

== See also ==
- Communes of the Corrèze department
