= Beaulieu-sur-Dordogne =

- Commune
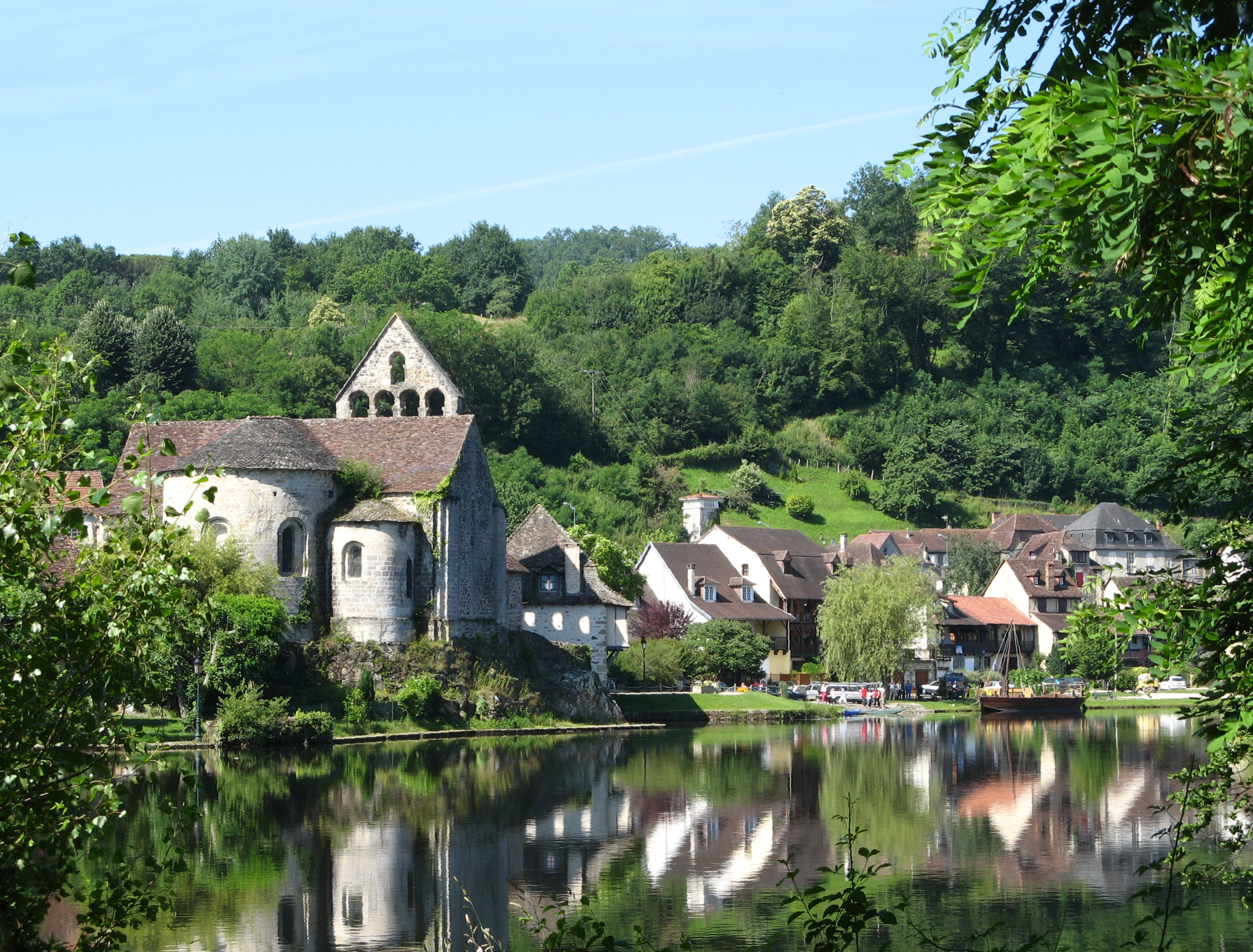
- Beaulieu-sur-Dordogne in 2010

- Coat of arms
- Location of Beaulieu-sur-Dordogne
- Location within France Location within Nouvelle-Aquitaine
- Coordinates: 44°58′45″N 1°50′21″E
- Country: France
- Region: Nouvelle-Aquitaine
- Department: Corrèze
- Arrondissement: Brive-la-Gaillarde
- Canton: Midi Corrézien
- Intercommunality: Midi Corrézien

Government
  - Mayor (2026–32): Dominique Cayre
- Area^{1}: 16.89 km^{2} (6.52 sq mi)
- Highest elevation: 432 m (1,417 ft)
- Lowest elevation: 125 m (410 ft)
- Population (2023): 1,310
  - Density: 77.6/km^{2} (201/sq mi)
- Time zone: UTC+01:00 (CET)
  - Summer (DST): UTC+02:00 (CEST)
- INSEE/Postal code: 19019 /19120
- ^{1} French Land Register data, which excludes lakes, ponds, glaciers > 1 km^{2} (0.386 sq mi or 247 acres) and river estuaries.

Beaulieu-sur-Dordogne (French pronunciation: [boljø syʁ dɔʁdɔɲ], literally Beaulieu on Dordogne; Occitan: Belluec) is a commune in the Corrèze department in the Nouvelle-Aquitaine region, central France. Beaulieu is a medieval city, originally dominated by its great abbey of St Pierre, of which only the abbey church remains. On 1 January 2019, the former commune Brivezac was merged into Beaulieu-sur-Dordogne. It is a member of Les Plus Beaux Villages de France (The Most Beautiful Villages of France) Association.

== Geography ==
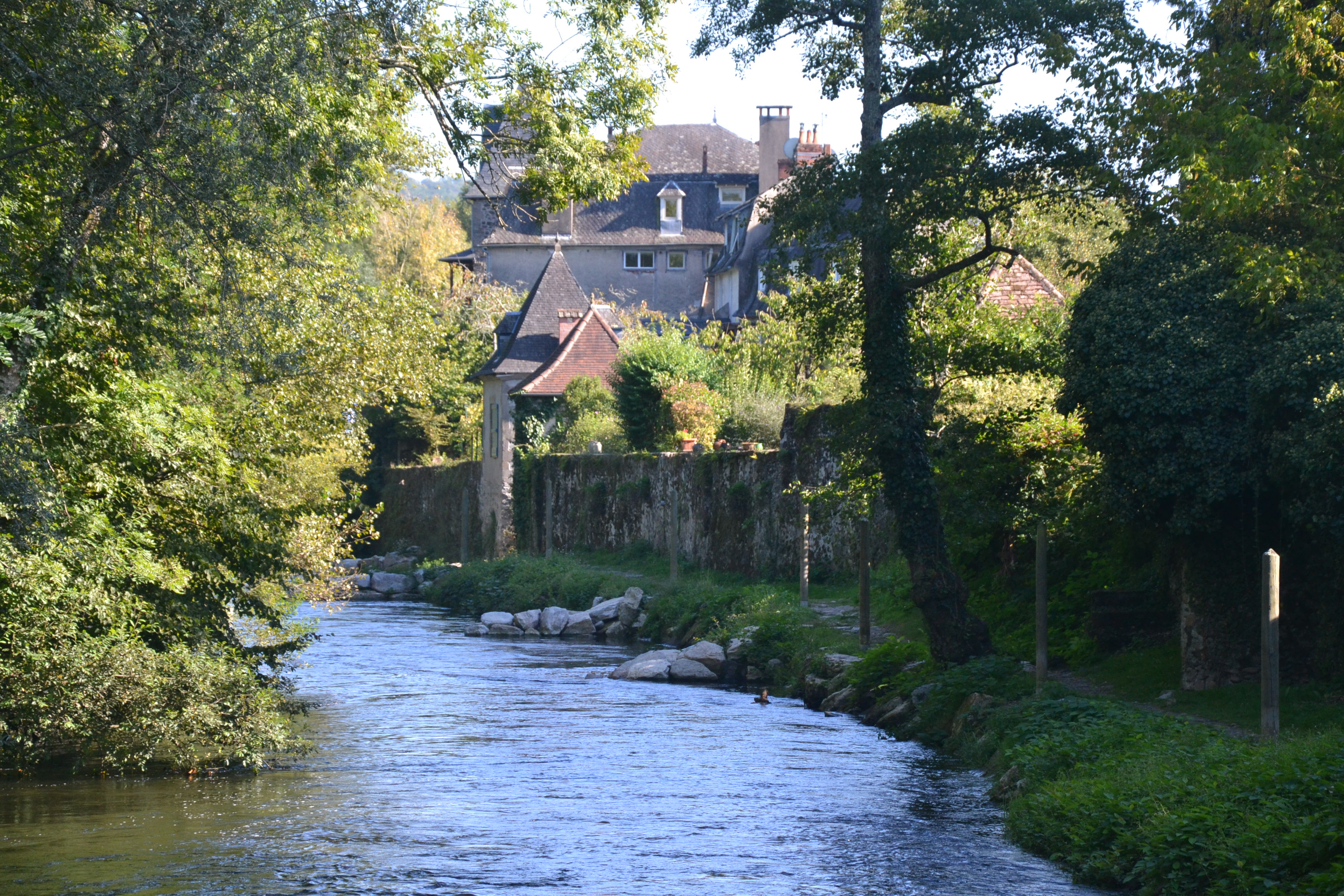
One of the arms of the Dordogne river crossing the village.

=== Toponymy ===
Beaulieu comes from the Latin "bellus locus", "lieu beau", a nice place to live. The inhabitants of Beaulieu are called by varies names: Beaulieusard, Beaulieurois, Bellilocien, Bellieurain, Bellilocois, Belliloquois, Belliloqueteux, Belliquière, Berlugan, Beloudonien.

=== Location ===
Beaulieu is in the south of the Corrèze department. It is located on the D940 road on the banks of the Dordogne river, south of the Limousin. Tulle is 37 km north. Brive-la-Gaillarde is 38 km away and Collonges-la-Rouge is 20 km to the northwest. Aurillac (Cantal) is 60 km to the east.

=== Hydrography and relief ===
The commune is limited on its entire eastern border by the Dordogne, and watered to the north by its tributary the Ménoire.

== History ==
=== Middle ages ===
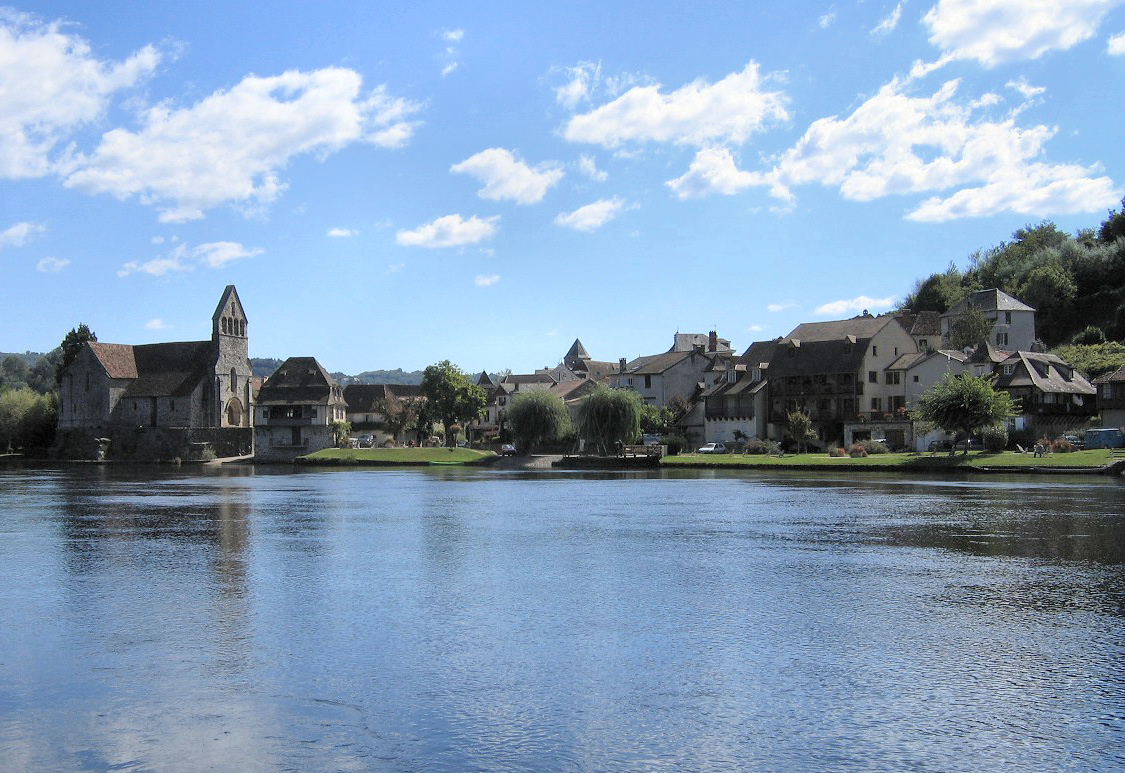
Chapelle des pénitents (left) in the village of Beaulieu-sur-Dordogne across the river from Altillac.

In the midst of the War of succession at the head of Aquitaine, around 855, Rodolphe de Turenne, Archbishop of Bourges, rallied to the legitimate cause embodied by Charles the Bald, was committed to establishing a monastic foundation on his family lands. After a vain attempt at Végennes, he turned to Vellinus. The cartulary of the abbey reported that at the sight of the place's splendour, he could not help but baptise it "bellus locus". From the great Solignac Abbey, he invited a team of monks to set up a new monastery and participated with his wide kin in the building of the abbey's heritage. The monastery was consecrated in 860. Like those at nearby Uzerche and Limoges, the abbey of Saint Pierre at Beaulieu was a Benedictine foundation and flourished largely because of its proximity to the Way of St. James. The first monks came from the abbey of Solignac, near Limoges.

Thanks to the pious donations of the Counts of Quercy, the Viscounts of Turenne, their multiple vassals, the area of the abbey consists of a third of the Bas-Limousin. Endowed with a treasure trove of relics (Saint-Prime and Félicien), and although it suffered from secular lusts, it had a spectacular rise that allowed the development of pilgrimages. Beaulieu became an essential stage on the roads uniting Limoges to Aurillac and Figeac, leading to Conques, Moissac, Toulouse and Compostela. As its wealth grew, the independence of the abbey was threatened by neighbouring feudal lords and it was defended against their depredations by the bishops of Limoges. Annexed to the Cluny Abbey around 1095, it was reformed and experienced a favourable period and the construction of the great abbey church was begun and it continued for nearly half a century. In the fourteenth century, a separate western steeple was erected: this also acted as the town's belfry.

The powerful abbey, under the protection of popular saints, was located around fertile lands, an indispensable condition for the village inhabitants to develop. From the end of the 12th century, a village was built around the conventual buildings protected by a wall, punctuated by towers and bordered by a ditch. From the monastic enclosure, districts developed outside the walls: the Faubourg de la Grave, towards the Dordogne, where the former hospital was located; the main district at the site of the old village of Vellinus; the Barri du Trou in which the deceased were buried and the Mirabel district near the ancient orchards of the abbey. Beaulieu became an important commercial place from which emerged a true bourgeois community that aroused the desires of the Lords of Castelnau and Turenne.

From 1213, saw the end of the Cluny stranglehold, with the abbey losing power little by little. Beaulieu became the seat of the conflicts for power between the Lord Abbot, the middle-class and the Viscount of Turenne. With the beginning of the fifteenth century, the abbey gradually crumbled.

=== Modern era ===
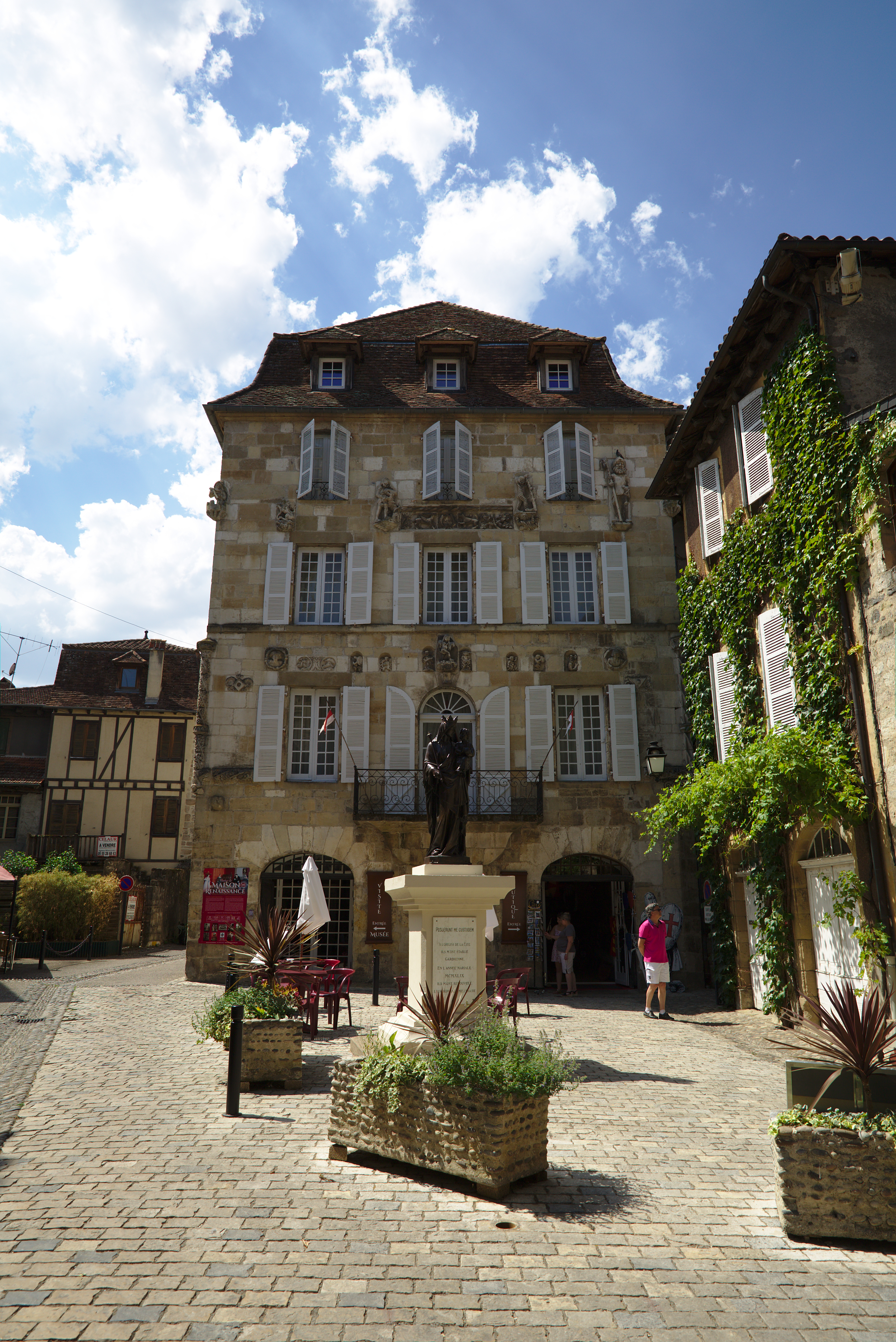
18th century house in front of the Abbey Church of St Pierre, decorated with various sculpted elements from disappeared 15th and 16th century buildings.

The abbey declined during the Hundred Years' War. The French Wars of Religion completed the process of the decline of the abbey. The abbey suffered attacks by the Protestants during that war. In 1569, soldiers of Admiral Coligny attacked the town and ransacked the church and abbey over eight days. They destroyed the woodwork, the statues of saints, the abbey's books and archives, stained windows, bells and took the shrine of Saint Prime and Felicien. The Protestant soldiers returned to ransack the abbey in 1574 and again in 1581. The monks had by then retreated to the safety of their chateaux in Astaillac.

The abbey church was then transformed into a Protestant temple. Now under the control of the Protestant Viscount of Turenne, the Protestant religion took hold in the town and the porch was hidden behind a market hall, the western entrance walled up, and services held in French. In 1586, the Catholic army under Charles, Duke of Mayenne recaptured the town and the remains of the abbey returned to the monks.

Given to the Catholic cult, in 1622, thanks to the Catholic League, the abbey was rebuilt in the seventeenth century by the Benedictine Congregation of Saint-Maur. The abbey was returned to the control of the Saint Maur Benedictines in 1663 when the Emmanual-Theodore de la Tour-d’Auvergne took over as abbot and concluded an agreement with former returning the monks to the new order. The monks had, after the religious wars, lost their religious ways, and resisted the takeover of the abbey by bishops and a parliament in Bordeaux. The new order brought about the repairs of the church, its statues and altar pieces and the abbey buildings. The city, again prosperous, erected its opulent mansions. The former Leaguer's created, with the help of the bishops, many brotherhoods. The Jesuits under Claude Faber established themselves in 1622 as did the Ursulines in 1633 who sought to educate girls.

=== French Revolution and Empire ===
Prior to the revolution, the town was part of Viscounty of Turenne, subject to his rule and they paid no tax to the French Crown. That changed in 1738, when the viscount sold his viscounty to King Louis XV, to pay off his debts, and the town's of the viscounty including Beaulieu, returned to the king and his tax system.

The abbey still sheltered six monks when the revolution destroyed the conventual buildings and the Maurist constructions. The abbey church was spared and became a parish church. Part of the vault collapsed in 1808 and in 1889, the square in front of the abbey church was cleared and created.

=== Contemporary period ===
On 1 January 2019 the municipality extended its perimeter to that of Brivezac.

== Population and society ==
=== Population ===
Population data refer to the area corresponding with the commune as of January 2025.

Historical population
Year	Pop.	±% p.a.
1968	1,895	—
1975	1,835	−0.46%
1982	1,732	−0.82%
1990	1,473	−2.00%
1999	1,485	+0.09%
2007	1,475	−0.08%
2012	1,368	−1.49%
2017	1,299	−1.03%
2023	1,310	+0.14%
Source: INSEE

=== Sport ===
Beaulieu's rugby club was created in 1908: Union Sportive Beaulieu (U.S.B.). A regular champion of the Limousin, the club participated in several stages of the French championship reaching the semifinals in 1921. During the 2011–2012 season, the club was shown by winning the title of Champion of France in 2nd Series by beating in the final, US Josbaig Saint Goin (15 to 11), crowning a great season and allowing the club to climb in 1st Series for the season 2012–2013.

== Economy ==
The Beaulieu region produces 400 tonnes of strawberries or nearly 1% of French production. In particular, it feeds the production of jams by the Andros group in its factories in Biars-Bretenoux. A strawberry festival is held on the second Sunday in May, where a strawberry pie is made of 8 metres diameter and 900 kg of strawberries.

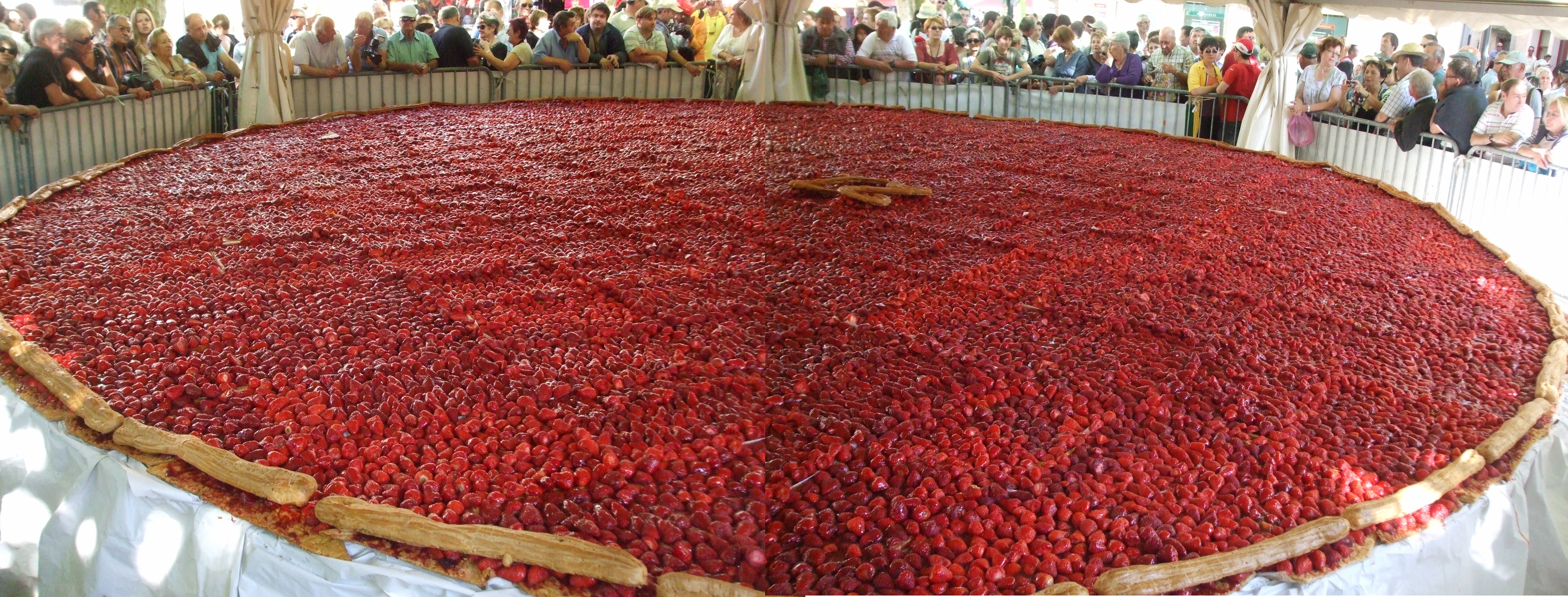
8 m diameter strawberry pie at the annual strawberry festival.

== Local culture and heritage ==
=== Civil buildings ===
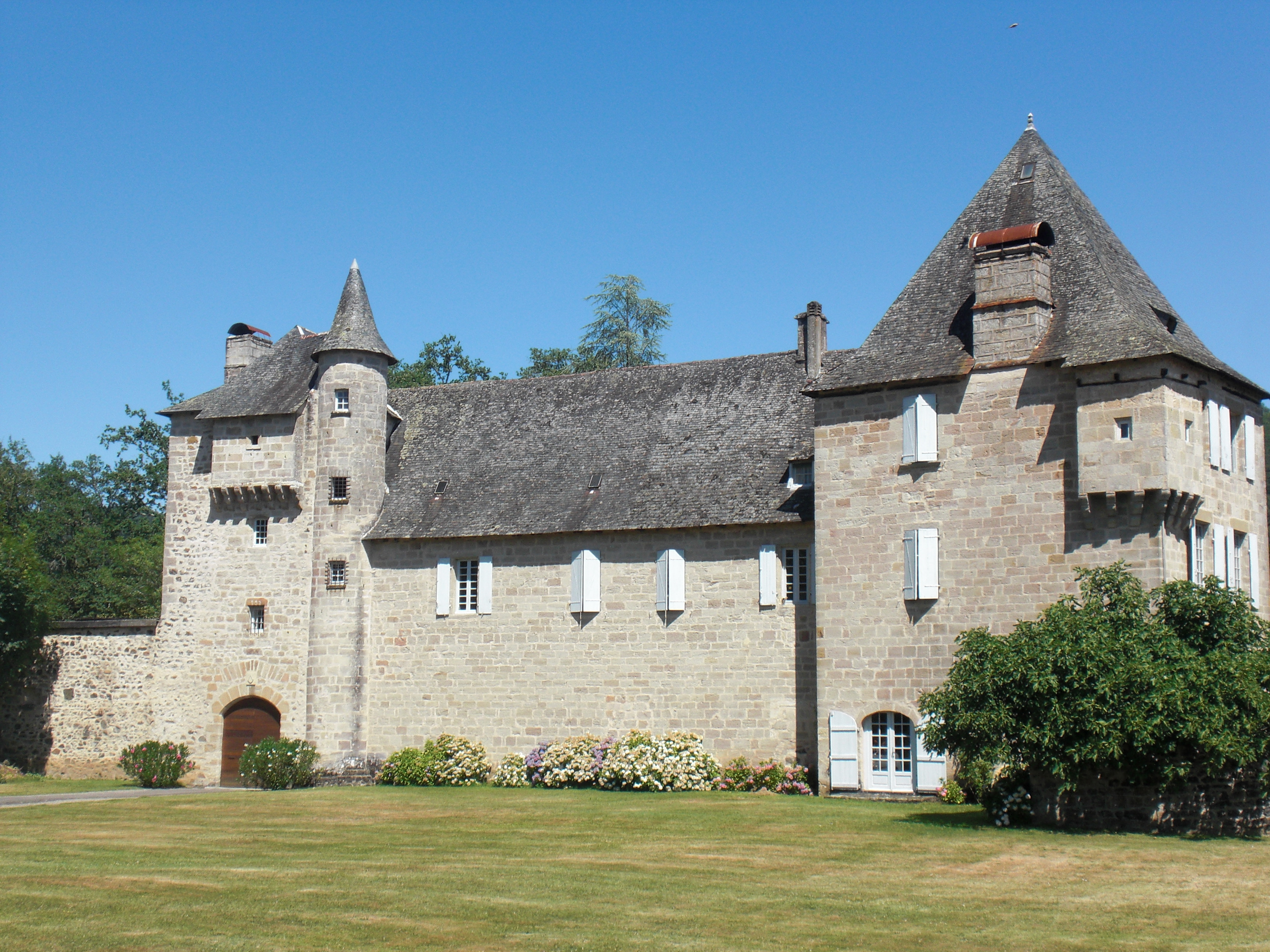
Château d'Estresse.

==== Château d'Estresse ====
The Chateau was built on a terrace supported by a medieval retaining wall on the Dordogne river, so as to defend Beaulieu and the upper valley from invasions from the river (King Odo of France stopped the Normans in 889). The Chateau consists of buildings from the 14th, 15th and 16th centuries, and one can still see a bretèche protruding over the entrance gate. The Chateau approached the twentieth century in the state of ruin, but it was restored. It is included in the inventory of historical monuments.

=== Religious buildings ===
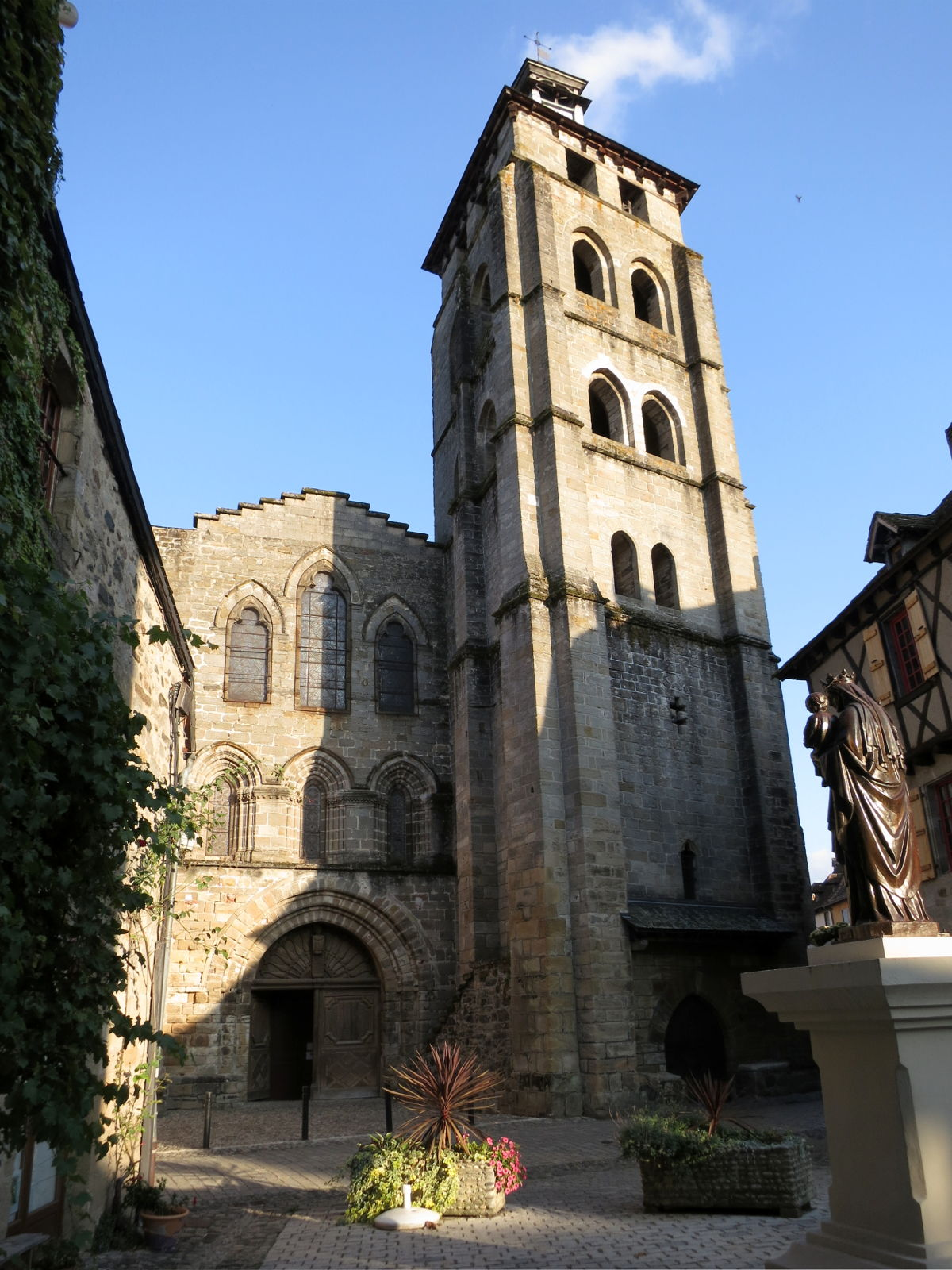
Abbey Church of St Pierre.

==== Abbey Church of St Pierre ====
Founded in the 9th century by Rodolphe of the family of the Counts of Turenne, Lords of Beaulieu, the abbey was attached to Cluny in the 11th century. Under the impetus of the Gregorian reforms, the pilgrimages flourished, necessitating the construction of new, better-adapted churches.

In 1150, the choir and transept of the new Church of Beaulieu were already completed. The construction would continue until the 13th century. The plan was similar to the other Romanesque churches of the pilgrimages, with a Latin Cross, having a nave with aisles and an ambulatory allowing pilgrims, to pray to the saints of their choice in the apsidal chapel without disturbing high altar. The architect Anatole de Baudot carried out restoration work.

The church has a nave of four spans. The choir, the southern arm of the transept and much of the nave date back to the original Romanesque phase of the building. The belfry and the central tower are of later, Gothic construction. The total length of the building is 71 metres, and the width at the transept is 38 metres. The nave rises to 17 metres, while the central tower exceeds it by 6 metres.

The most notable feature of the church is the elaborately sculpted south portal, particularly the tympanum. Instead of the usual Last Judgement, this depicts the Second Coming, the triumphant return of Christ, and the General Resurrection. A 2.1 metre Christ, his arms spread in the form of a cross, is flanked by the 12 Apostles, while angels above him carry the crown and nails. Meanwhile, other angels sound the trumpet to summon up the dead.

Another notable feature is a fine baroque retable in gilded wood, dating from 1678, shortly after the refounding of the abbey. It depicts the Assumption of the Virgin. The treasury contains a number of important high medieval items, including a Virgin and Child and two arm reliquaries, all made of wood and covered in silver or gold leaf.

=== Cultural heritage ===
In its 2017 charts, le Conseil national des villes et villages fleuris de France (National Council of the Flower Towns and Villages of France) awarded a flower to the commune in the Concours des villes et villages fleuris (Contest of the Flowers towns and villages).

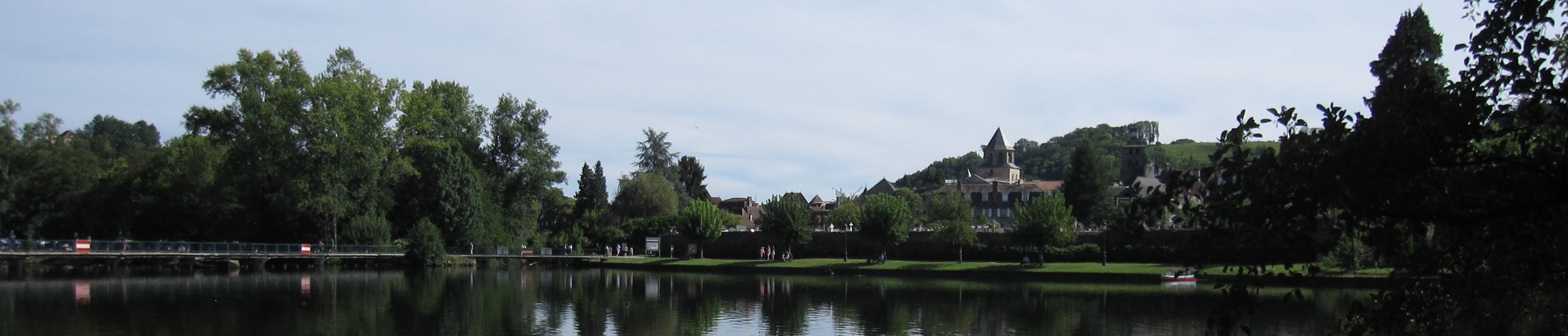
Panoramic view of Beaulieu-sur-Dordogne.

== Personalities ==
Notable personalities linked to the commune include:

- Eustorg de Beaulieu (1495–1552), French poet, composer and pastor
- Jean-Antoine Marbot (1754–1800), French general and politician, father of generals Adolphe and Marcellin Marbot
- Adolphe Marbot (1781–1844), French general
- Marcellin Marbot (1782–1854), French general, author of the famous Memoirs of General Marbot
- Frits Thaulow (1847–1906), Norwegian Impressionist painter
- Asher Peres (1934–2005), Israeli physicist

== Gallery ==
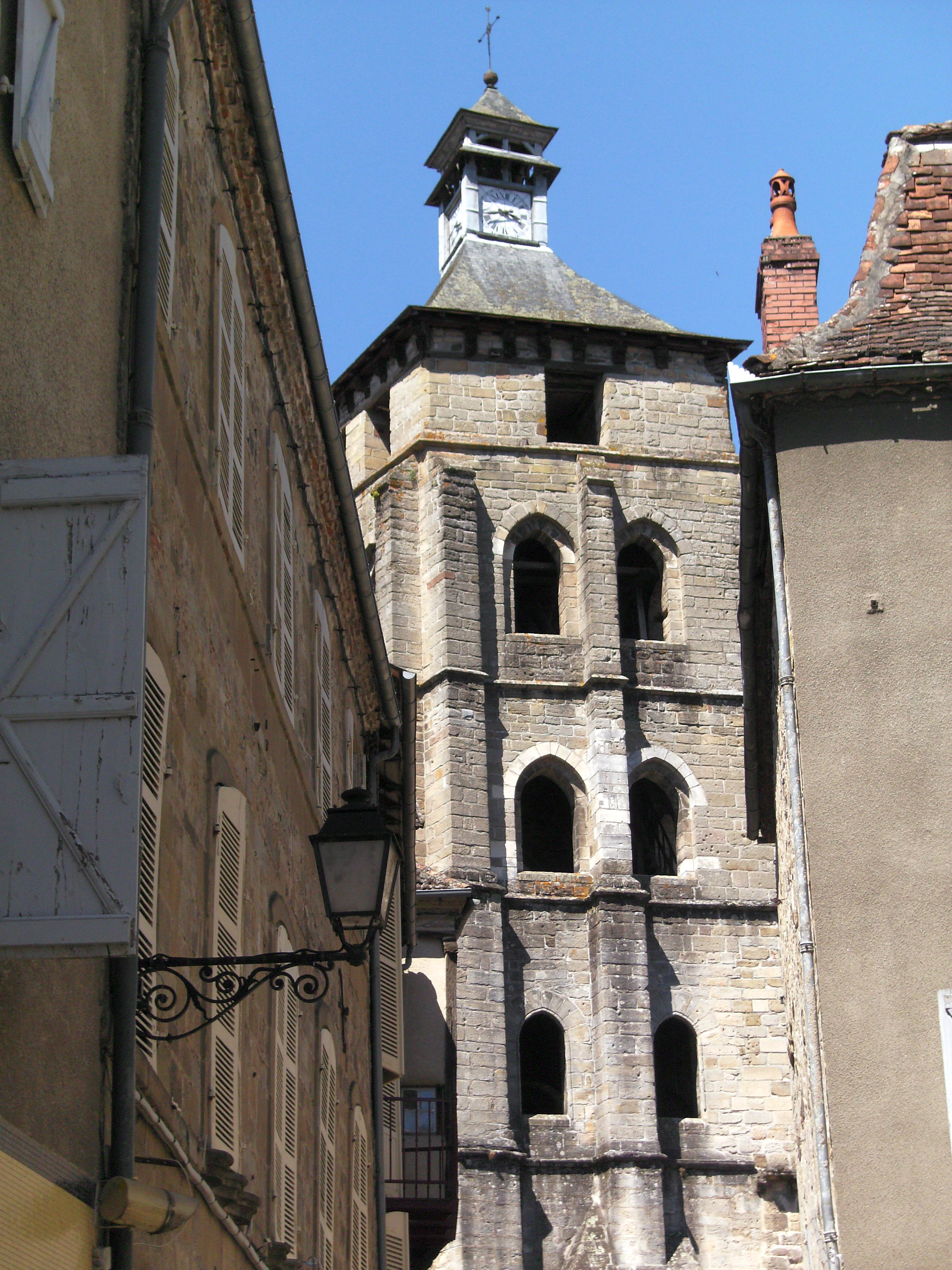
The belfry of the abbey church in Beaulieu-sur-Dordogne.

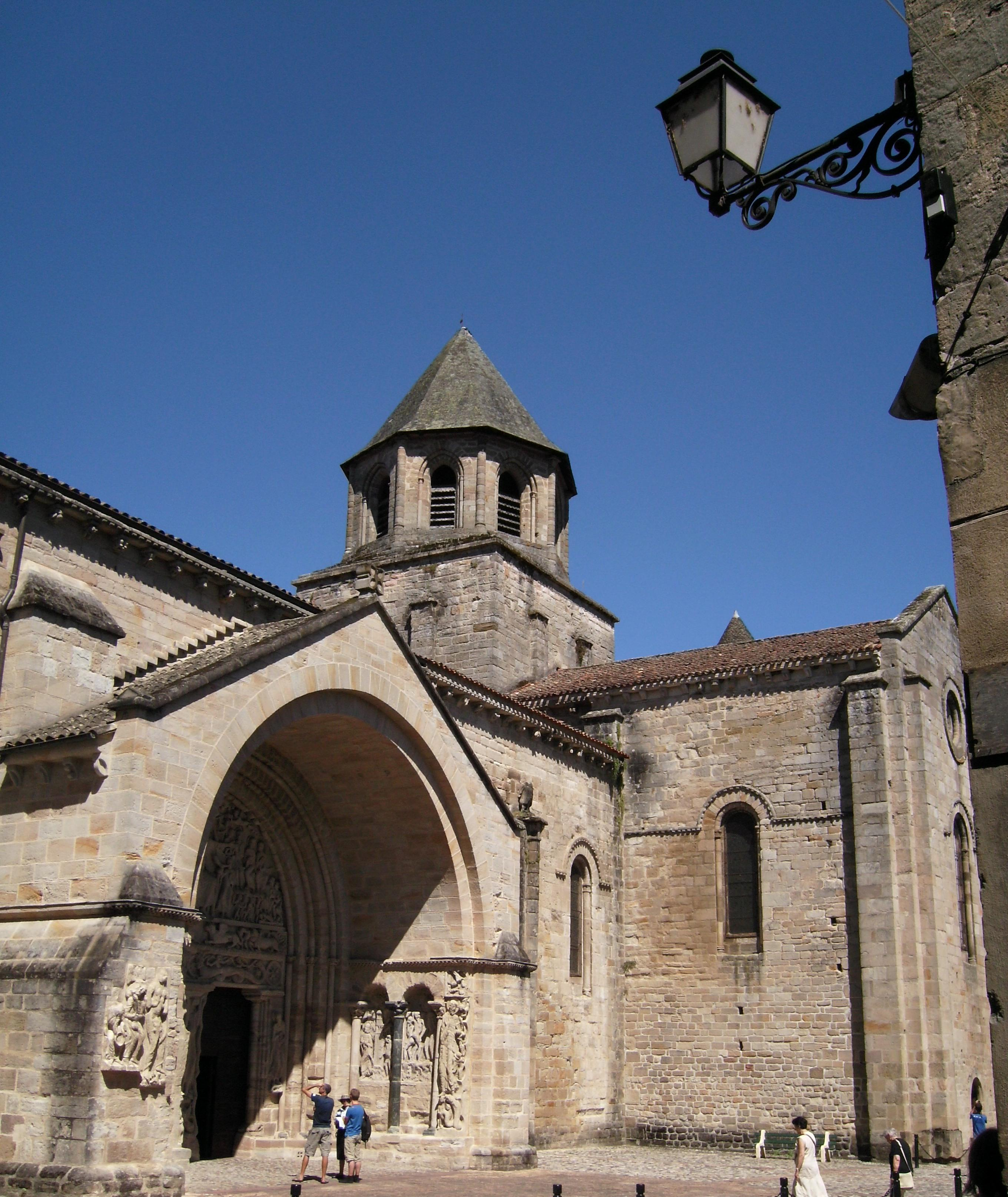
Southern portal of the abbey church.

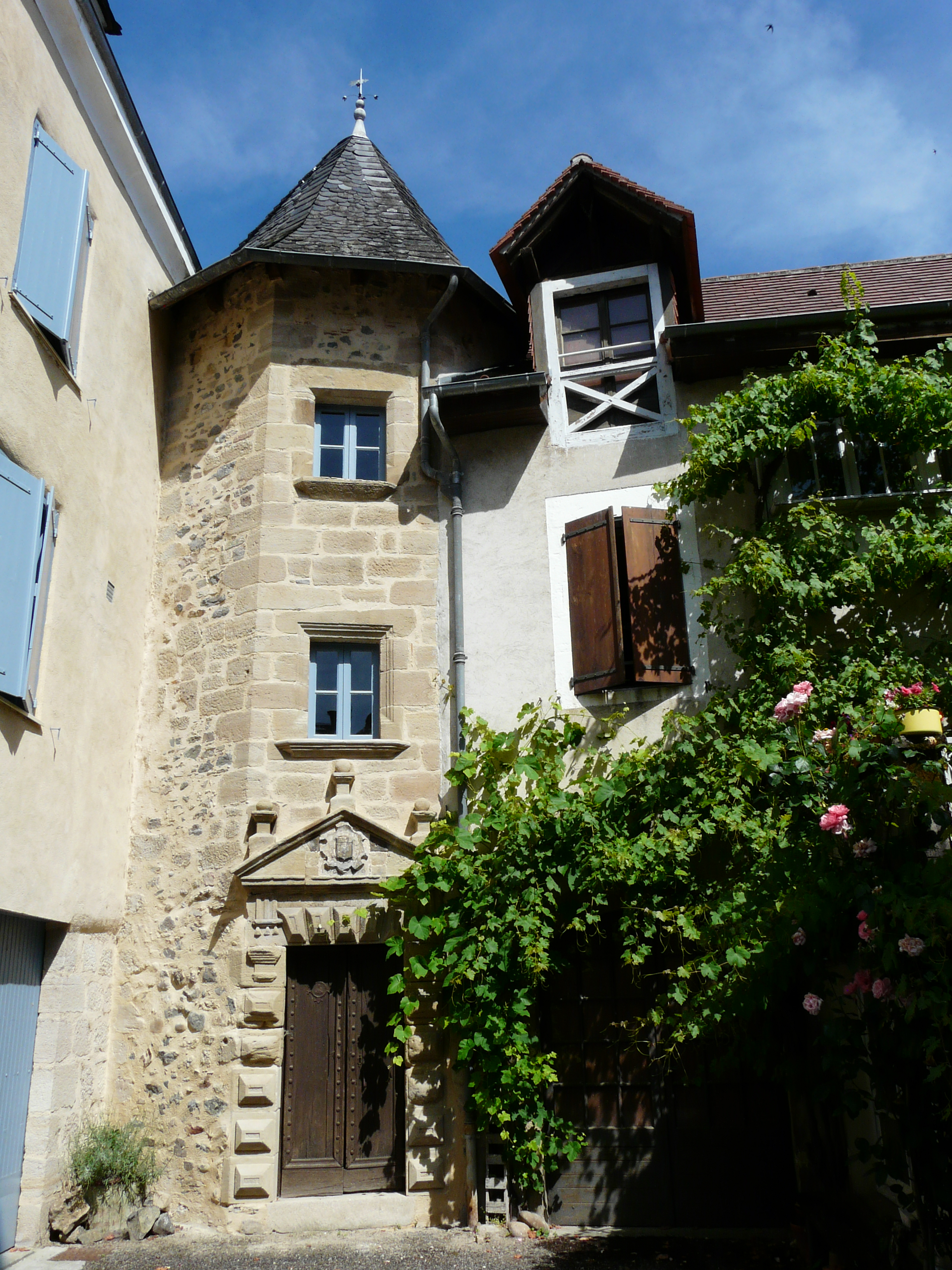
Maison Clare entrance.

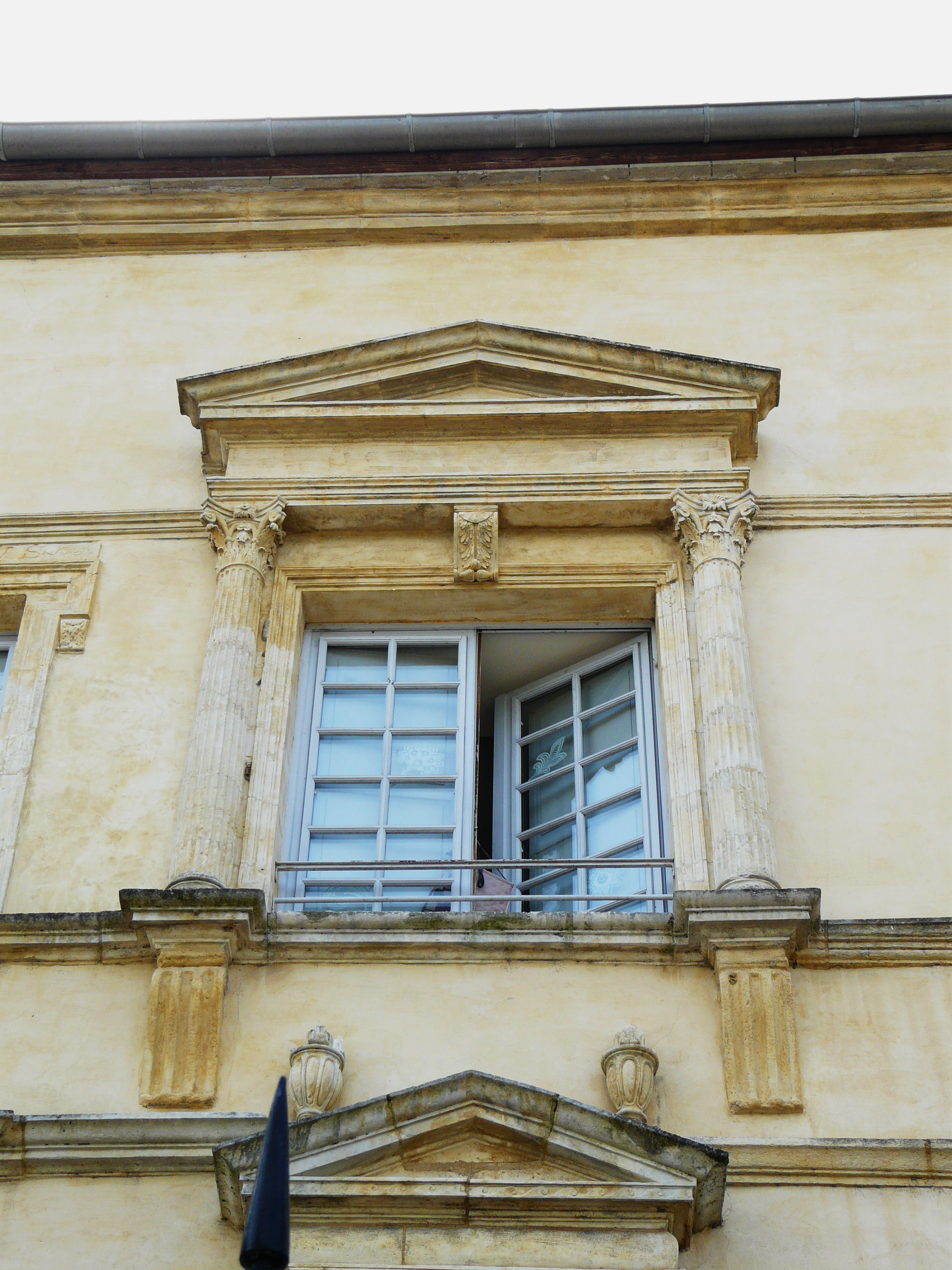
Sévigné institution building window detail.

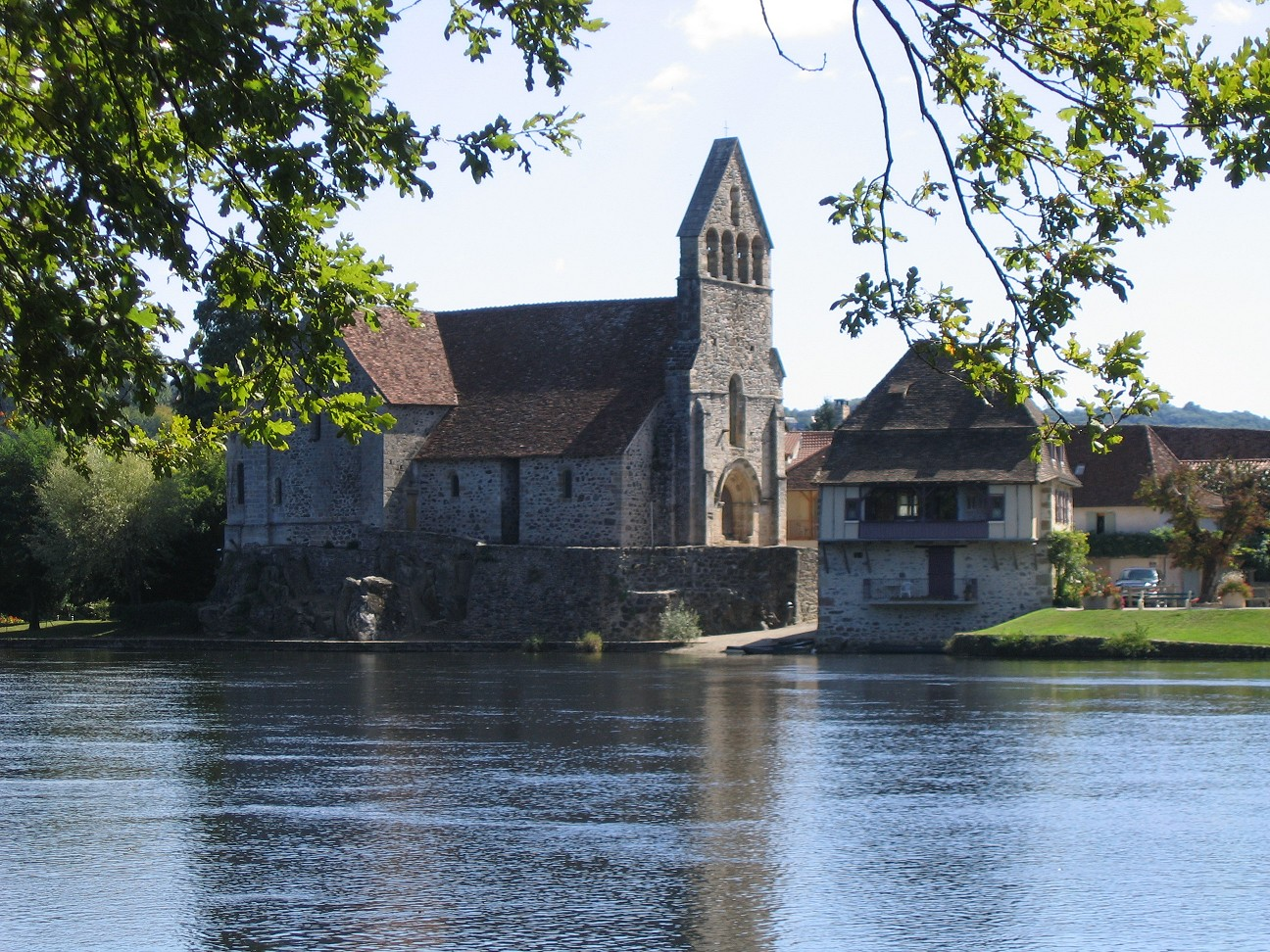
Chapelle des pénitents on the bank of the Dordogne river.

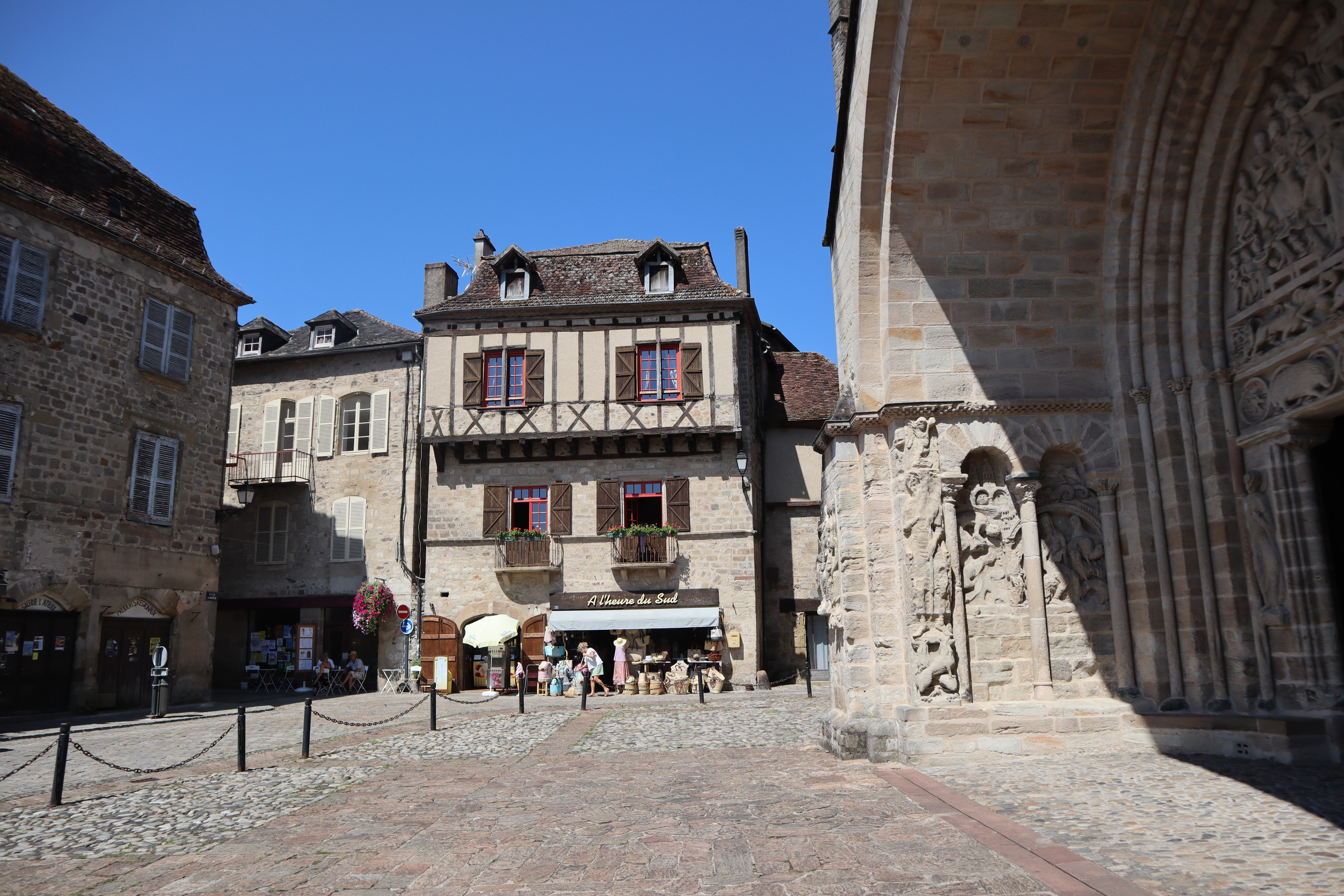
15th century house, Place de la Bridolle.

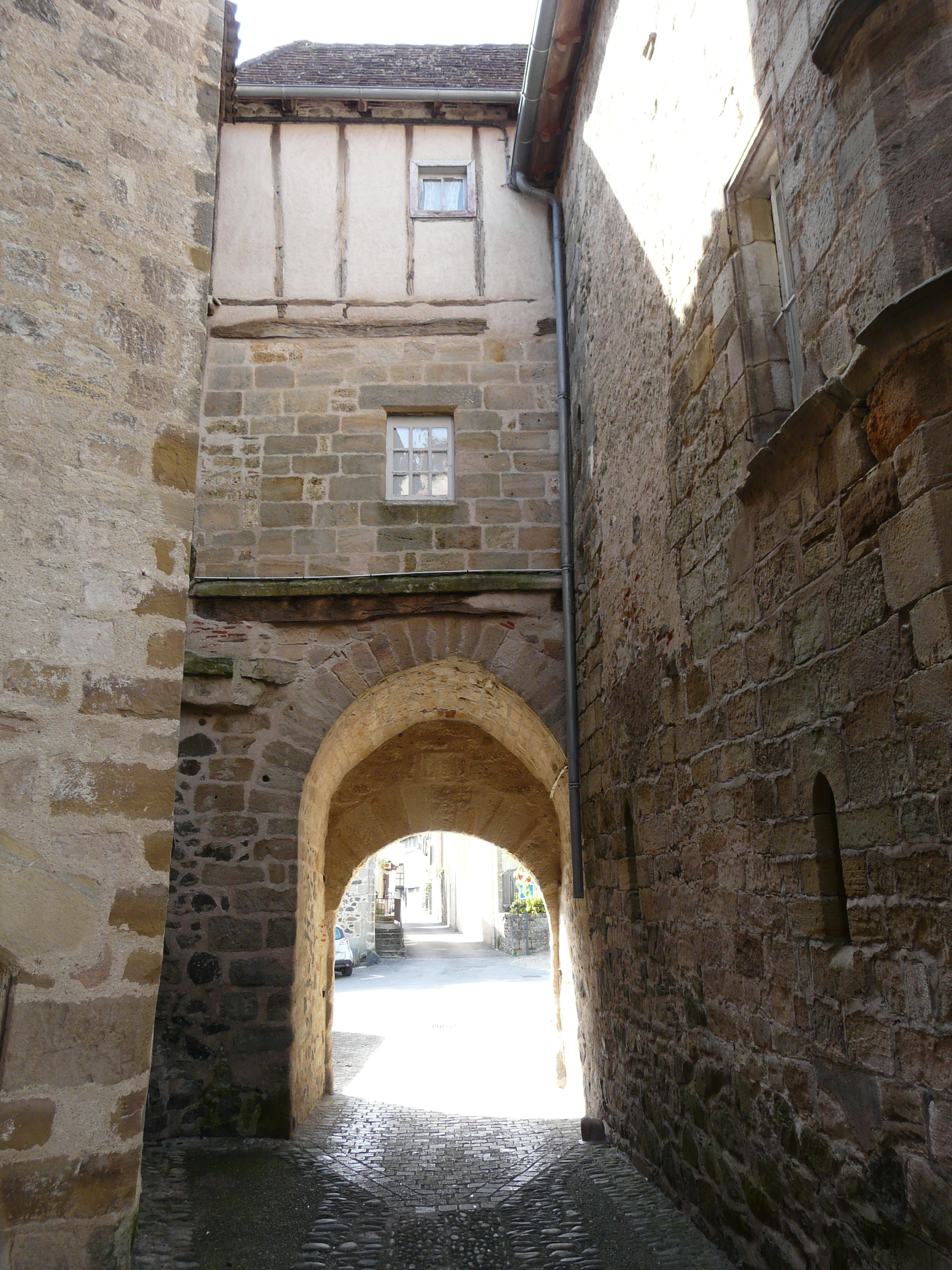
Interior view of the Ste Catherine gate.

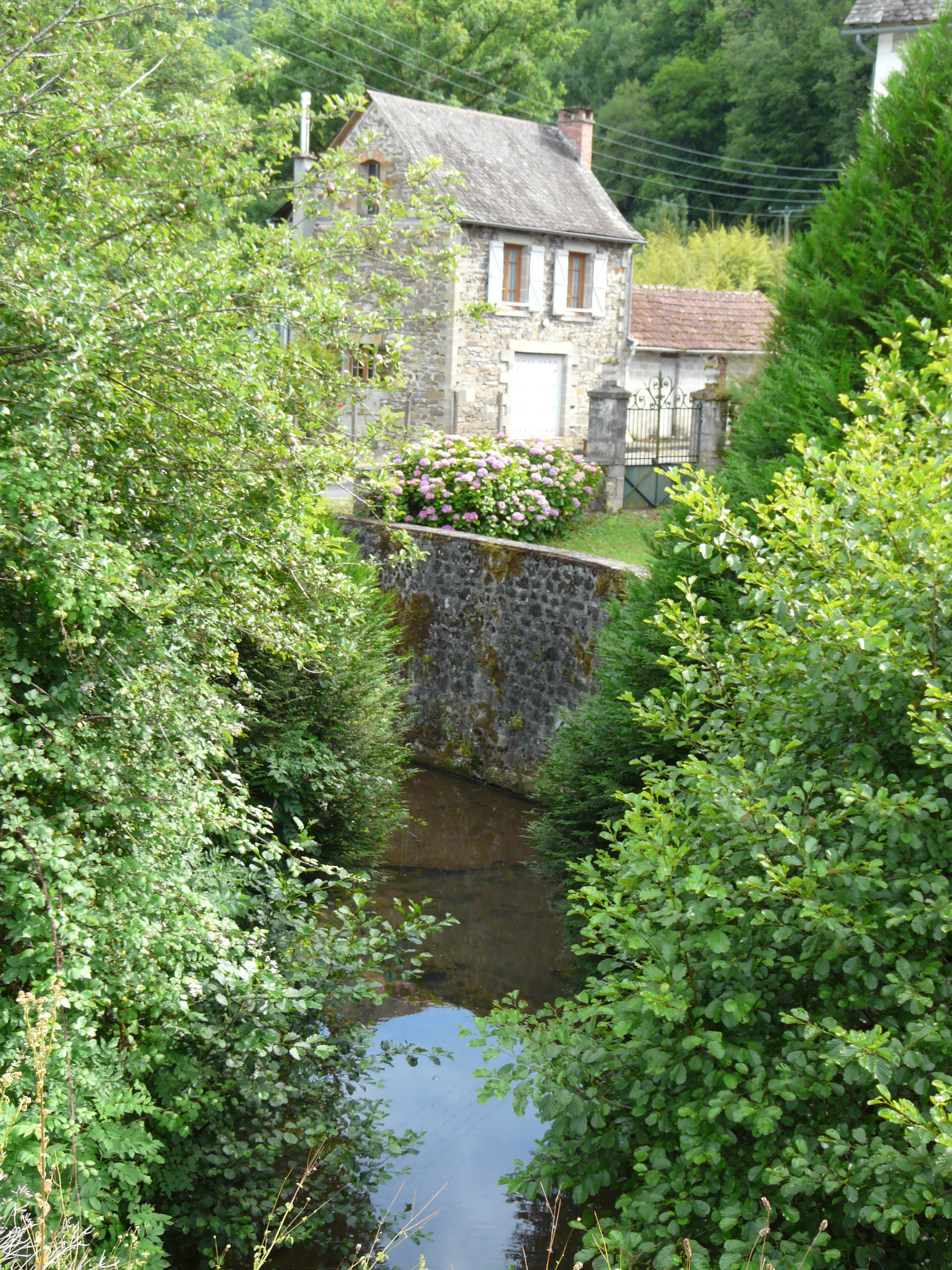
Abadiol mill.

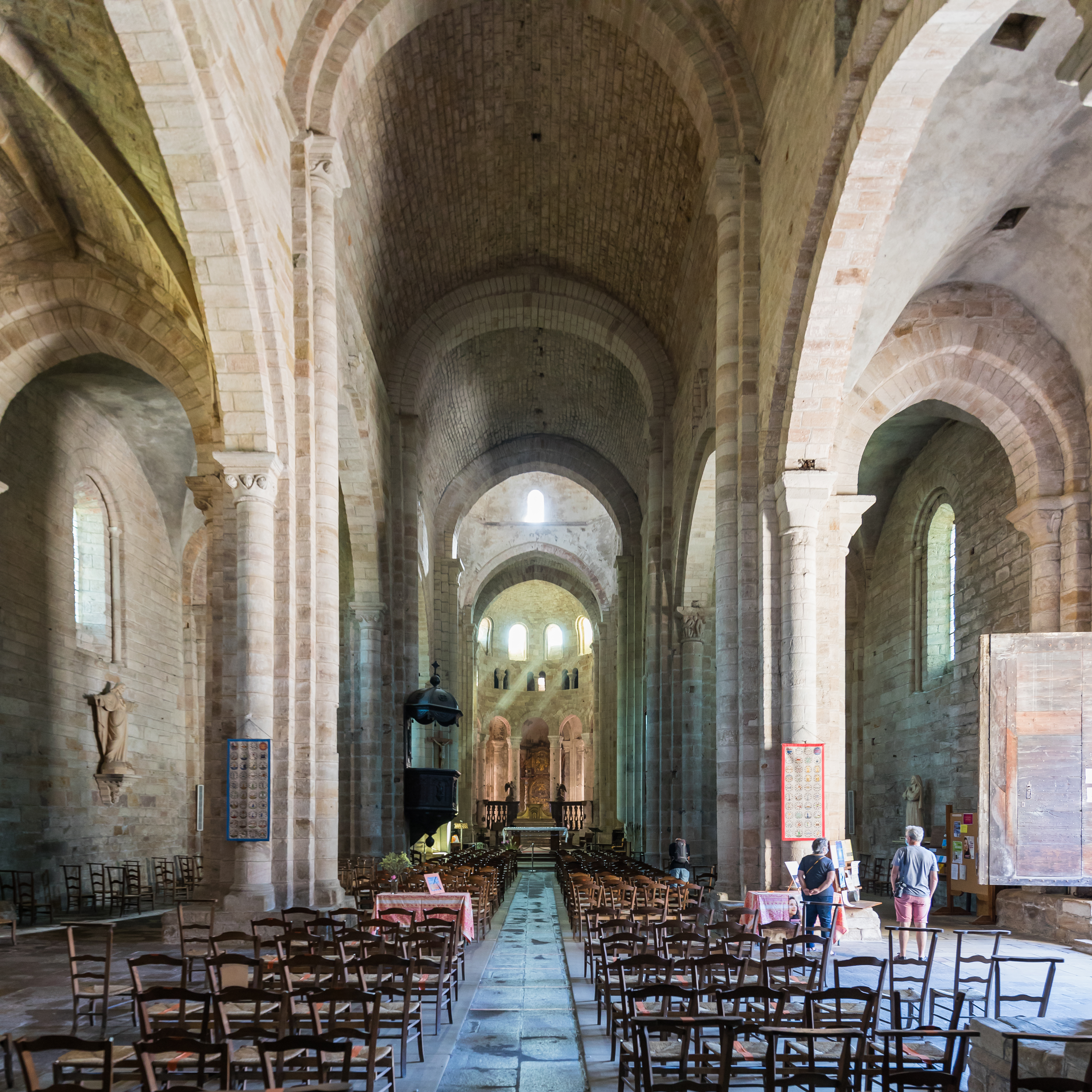
Nave of the St Pierre abbey church.

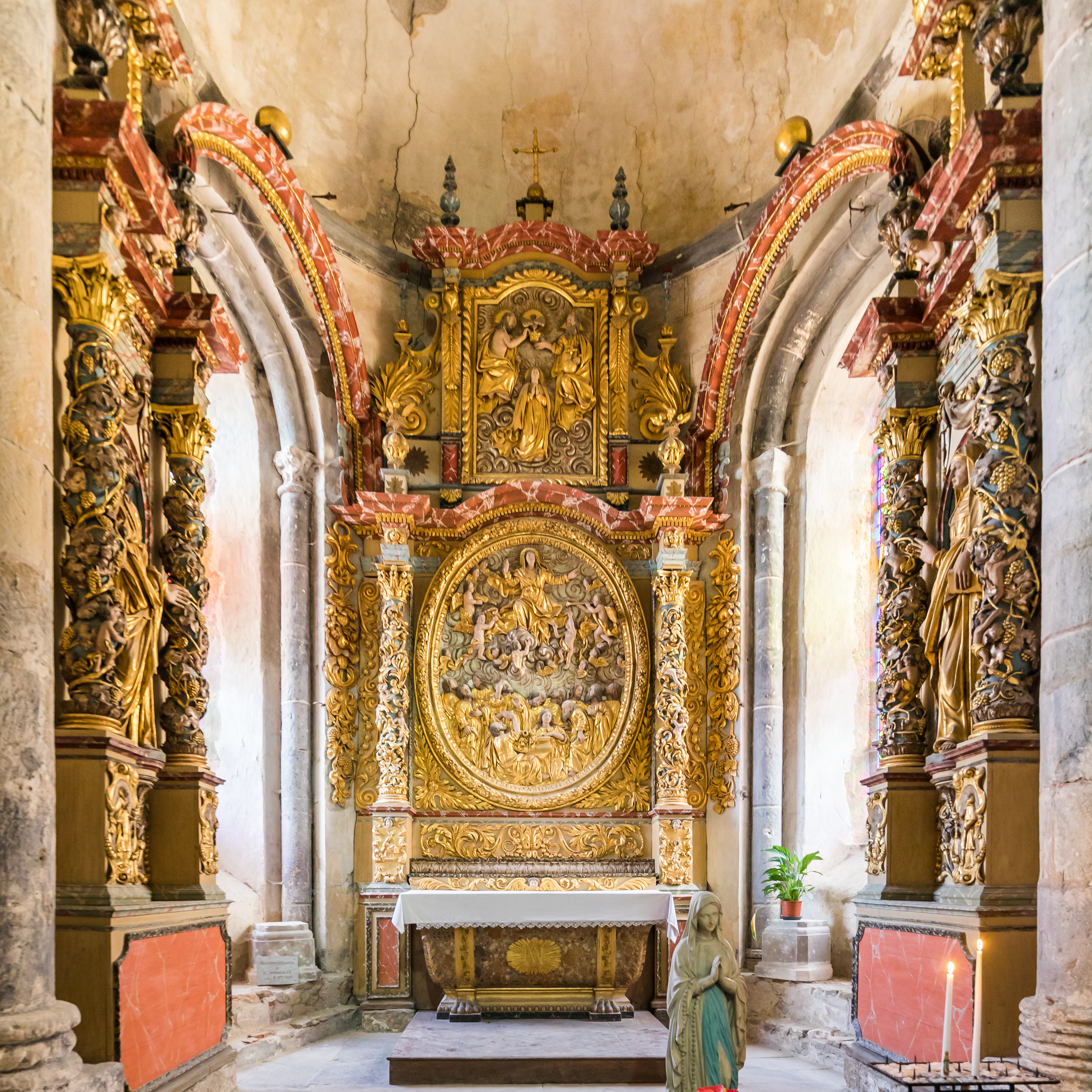
Assumption of the Virgin Mary retable in the St Pierre abbey church.

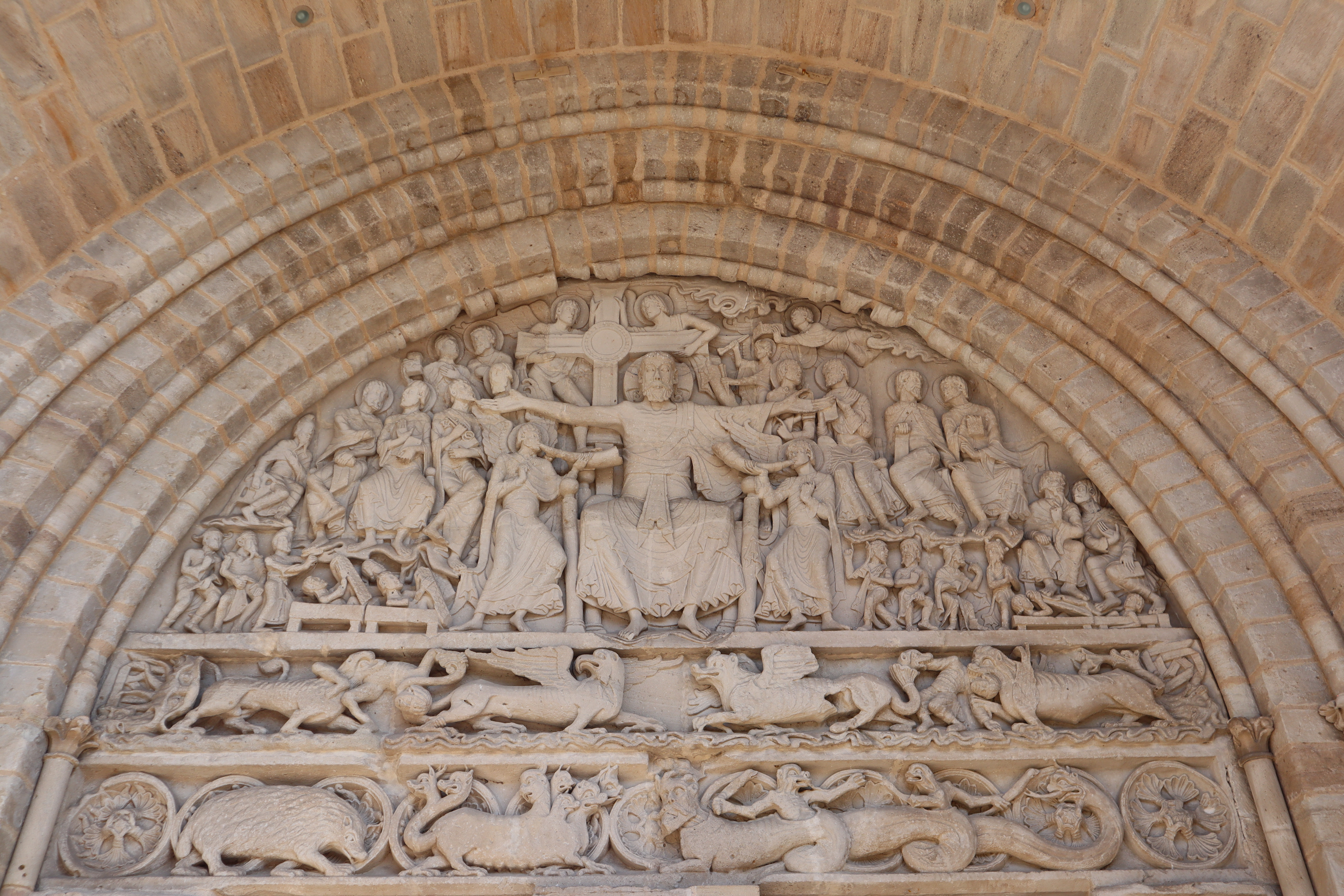
The return and triumph of Christ, depicted on the southern portal tympanum of the St Pierre abbey church.

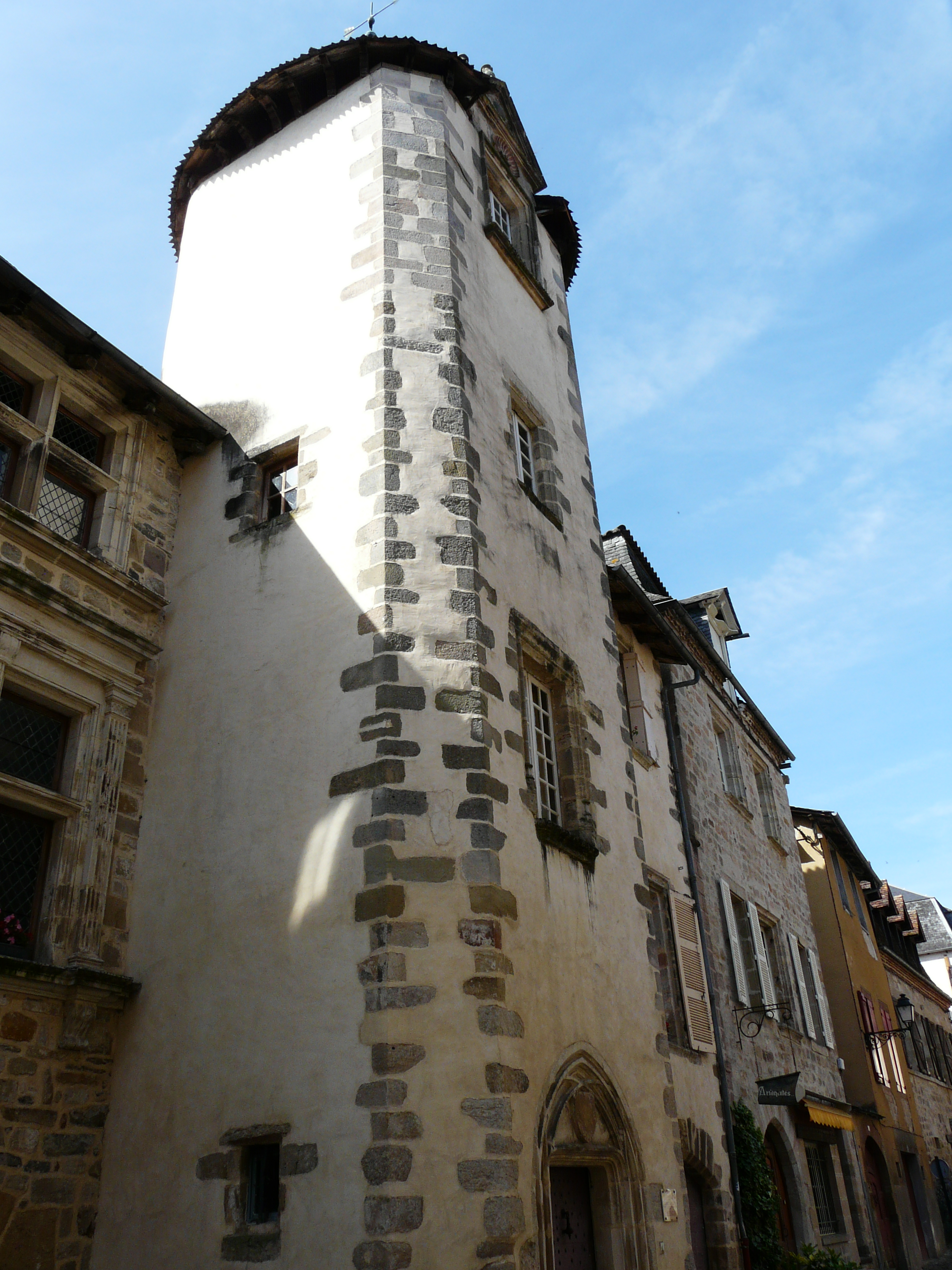
Maison Calary tower.

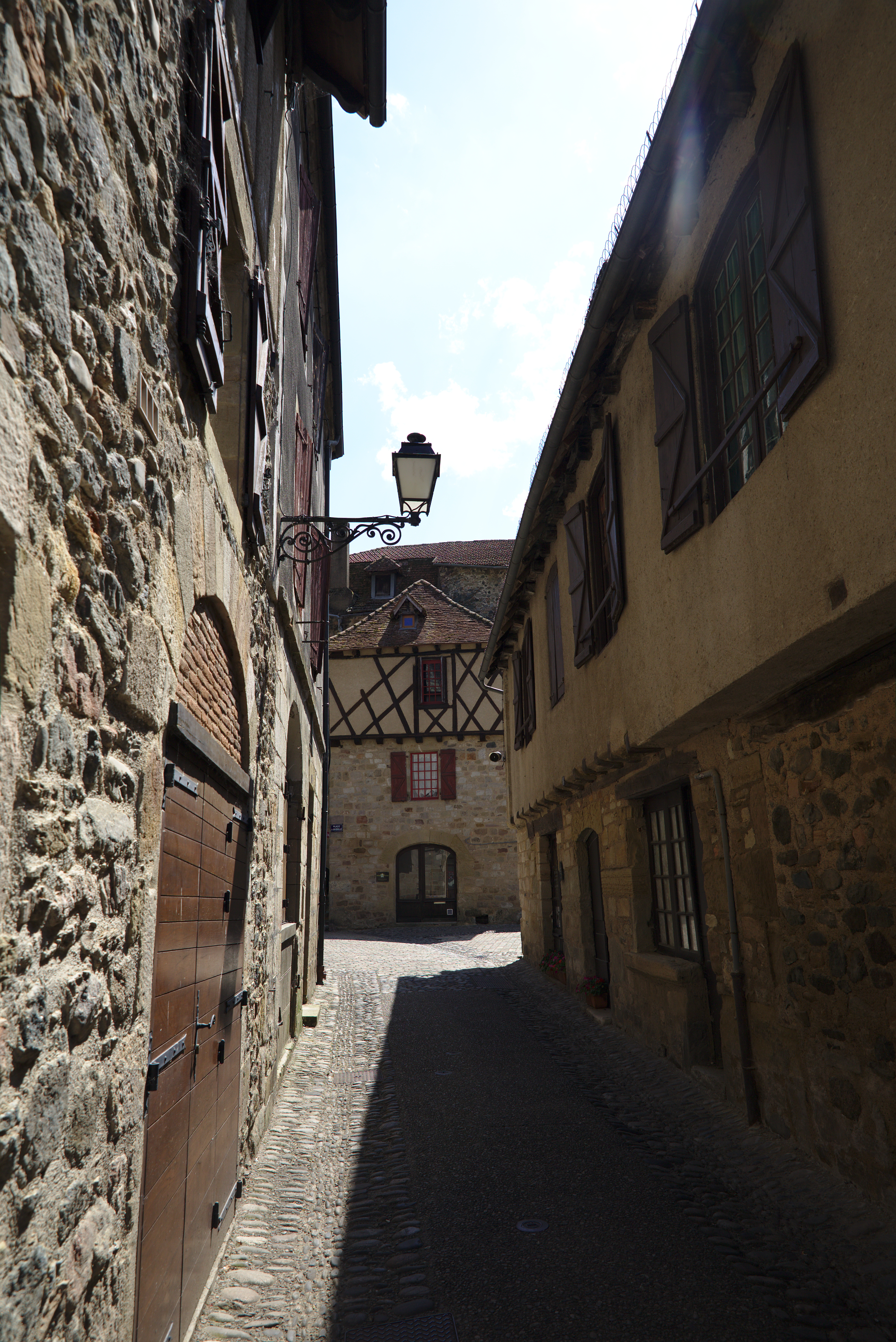
View of a house on Place de la Bridolle.

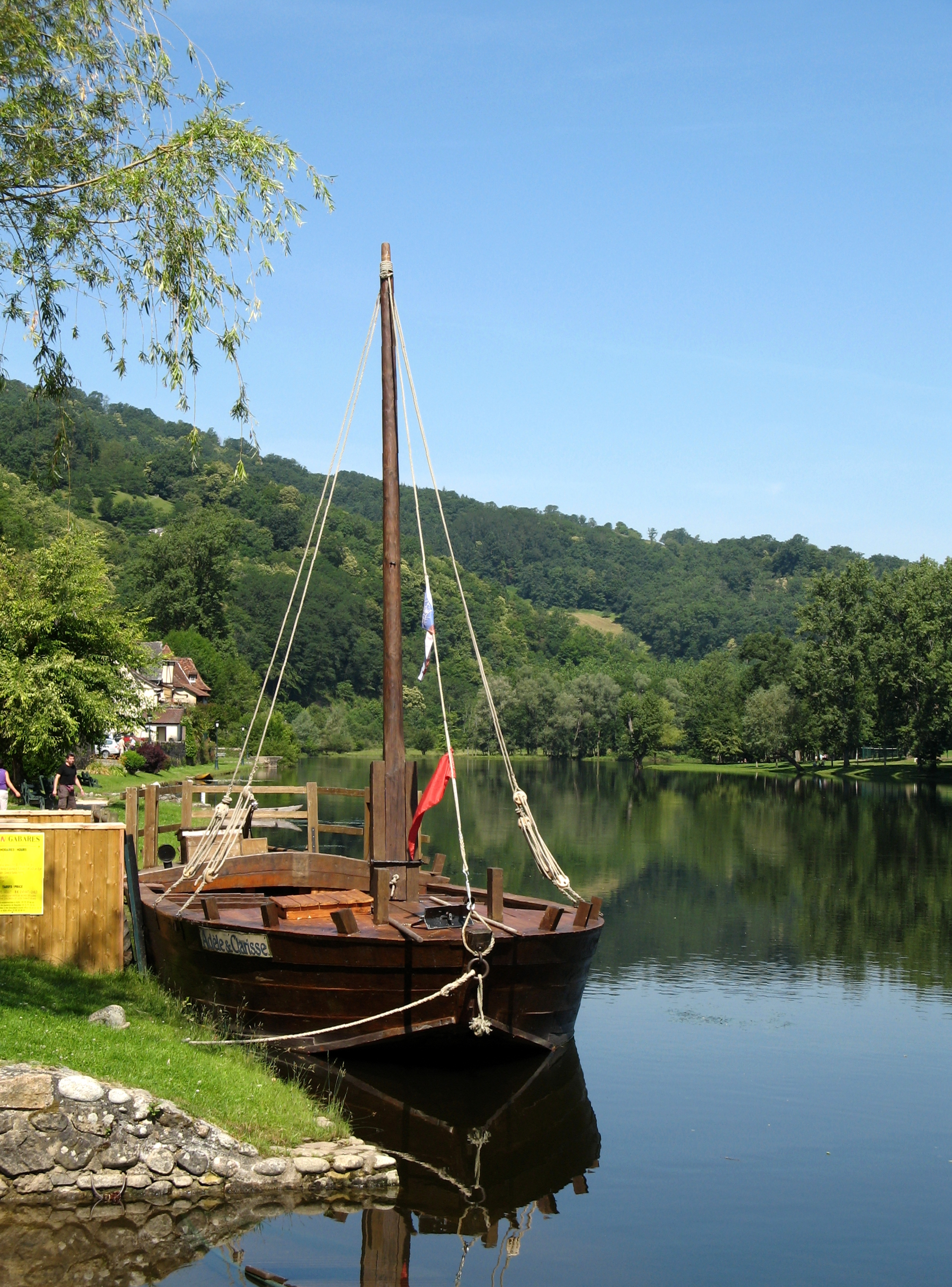
Dordogne riverbank.

== See also ==
- Communes of the Corrèze department
