= Brivezac =

- Part of Beaulieu-sur-Dordogne
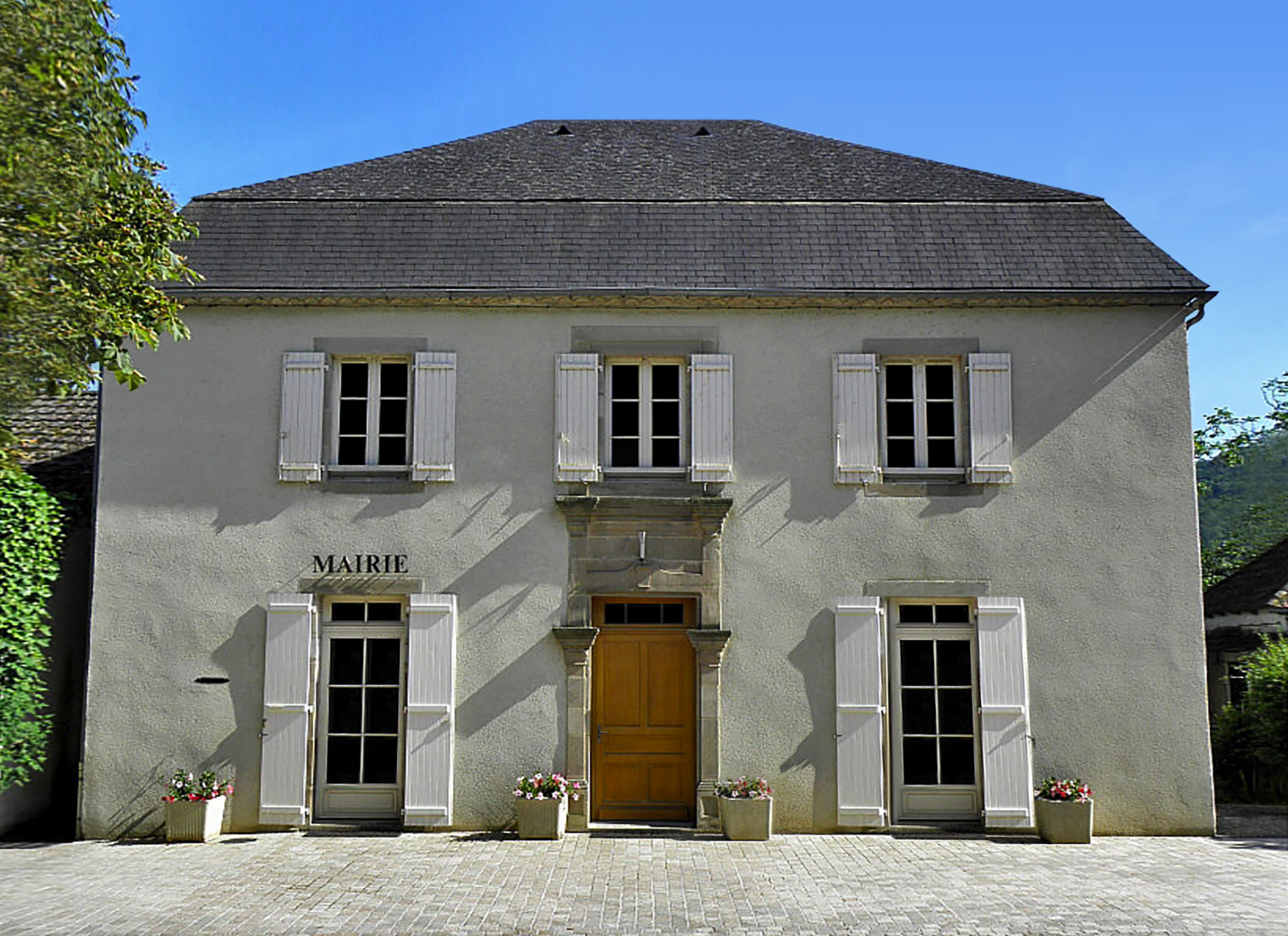
- Location of Brivezac
- Location within France Location within Nouvelle-Aquitaine
- Coordinates: 45°01′35″N 1°50′28″E
- Country: France
- Region: Nouvelle-Aquitaine
- Department: Corrèze
- Arrondissement: Brive-la-Gaillarde
- Canton: Midi Corrézien
- Commune: Beaulieu-sur-Dordogne
- Area^{1}: 8.24 km^{2} (3.18 sq mi)
- Elevation: 160 m (520 ft)
- Highest elevation: 432 m (1,417 ft)
- Lowest elevation: 139 m (456 ft)
- Population (2023): 193
  - Density: 23.4/km^{2} (60.7/sq mi)
- Time zone: UTC+01:00 (CET)
  - Summer (DST): UTC+02:00 (CEST)
- Postal code: 19120
- ^{1} French Land Register data, which excludes lakes, ponds, glaciers > 1 km^{2} (0.386 sq mi or 247 acres) and river estuaries.

Brivezac (French pronunciation: [bʁivzak]; Limousin: Brivasac) is a former commune in the Corrèze department in central France. On 1 January 2019, it was merged into the commune Beaulieu-sur-Dordogne.

== Toponymy ==
The name has both Roman and Gaulish origins, ac being Latin and Briva Gaulish, meaning river ford.

== History ==
The village received the relics of Saint Faustus in 860 during the Norman invasions. They were brought there from the north, and then from the Solignac Abbey, to be protected from looters. The place where the ambassadors of the relics and the priests are said to have met is two kilometers upstream, on the road to Champeau. A spring is said to have gushed out during this meeting and was named the spring of Saint Faustus.

== Places and monuments ==
- Église Saint-Pierre de Brivezac - The church of Saint-Pierre was listed as a historical monument in 1988. Parts of the church date from twelfth century. The Romanesque portal of the church, suffering from erosion, is one of the oldest in Limousin is from the eleventh century.
- Spring of Saint Faustus

== See also ==
- Communes of the Corrèze department
