= Adolphe Marbot =

French general (1781–1844)

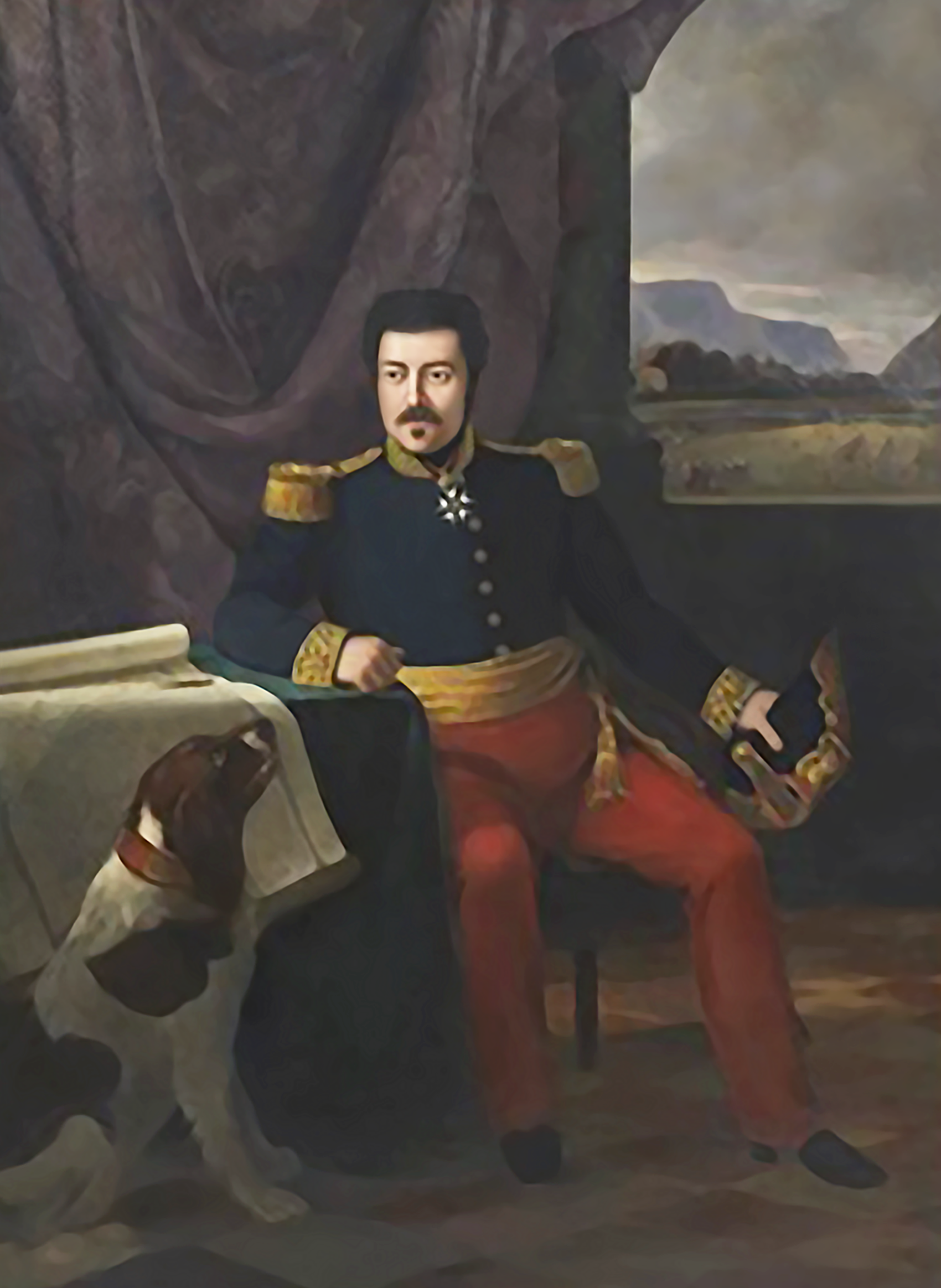
- General Marbot wearing the insignia of a Commander of the Legion of Honour
- Born: Antoine Adolphe Marcelin Marbot; 22 March 1781; Altillac, France
- Died: 2 June 1844 (aged 63); Altillac, France
- Relatives: Jean-Antoine Marbot, Divisional general (Father); Jean-Baptiste Antoine Marcelin Marbot, Lieutenant general (Brother); François Certain de Canrobert, Marshal of France (Cousin)
- Military career
- Allegiance: French Republic; French Empire; Kingdom of France; Kingdom of France
- Service years: 1798–1843
- Rank: Maréchal de camp (Brigadier general)
- Nickname: Marbot the Elder
- Conflicts: Napoleonic Wars; War of the Fourth Coalition; Peninsular War; Invasion of Russia
- Awards: Order of the Legion of Honour (Commander); Order of Saint Louis (Knight)
- Other work: Commander of the Aisne department

Antoine Adolphe Marcelin Marbot (Note: Marbot's full name as it appears in birth certificate and official documents.) (English: /mɑːrˈboʊ/ mar-BOH, French: [ɑ̃twan adɔlf maʁsəlɛ̃ maʁbo]; 22 March 1781 – 2 June 1844), known as Adolphe Marbot, (Note: He was known to contemporaries as "Adolphe Marbot", the name "Antoine Marbot" referring to his father.) was a French general. He belongs to a family that has distinguished itself particularly in the career of arms, giving three generals to France in less than 50 years. His younger brother, Marcellin Marbot, was also a general.

== Biography ==
=== Early life ===
Antoine Adolphe Marcelin Marbot was born into a family of military nobility in Altillac, in the ancient province of Quercy in southwestern France. He was the elder son of General Jean-Antoine Marbot, who had served as aide-de-camp to Lieutenant-Général de Schomberg, inspector general of the cavalry in the military household of the king of France.

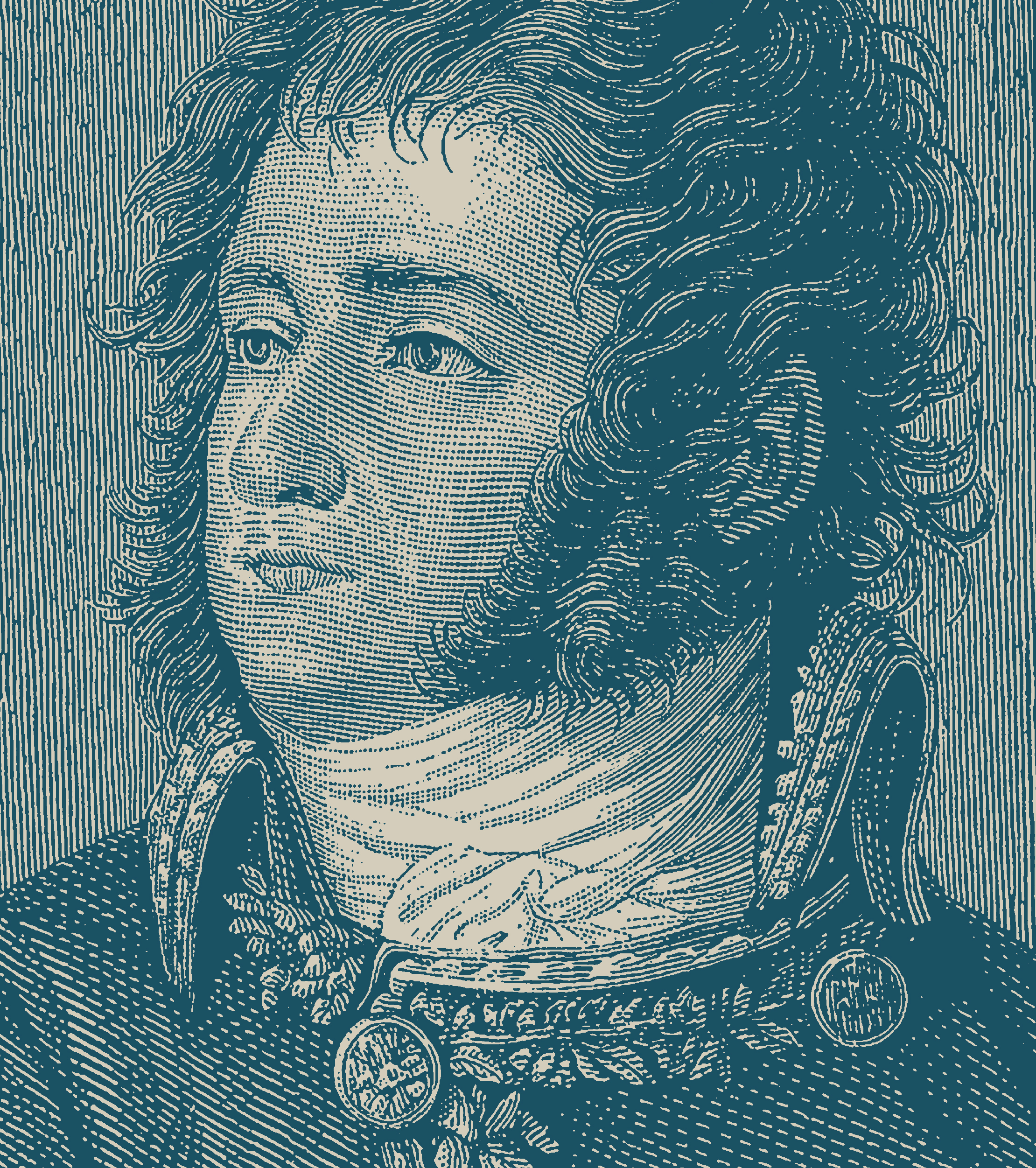
General Jean-Antoine Marbot (1754–1800), commander of a division of the Army of the Western Pyrenees

After completing his studies at the Military College of Sorèze, he joined the army at the age of seventeen, enlisting in the 21st Cavalry Regiment. He was promoted to the rank of second lieutenant on 5 October 1799, and became aide-de-camp to General Jean-Baptiste Bernadotte, commander-in-chief of the Army of the West (and future King Charles XIV John of Sweden), with the rank of lieutenant.

=== Consulate ===
In 1802, he was arrested on suspicion of participating in a Republican plot against the Consulate. General Bernadotte was suspected of being at the head of this plot and his aide-de-camp, the young Lieutenant Marbot, was interrogated at the Temple Prison in Paris, with the aim of obtaining a confession from him which he would not provide. He was released after 3 months in detention, although First Consul Napoleon Bonaparte continued to regard him as an opponent of the established regime.

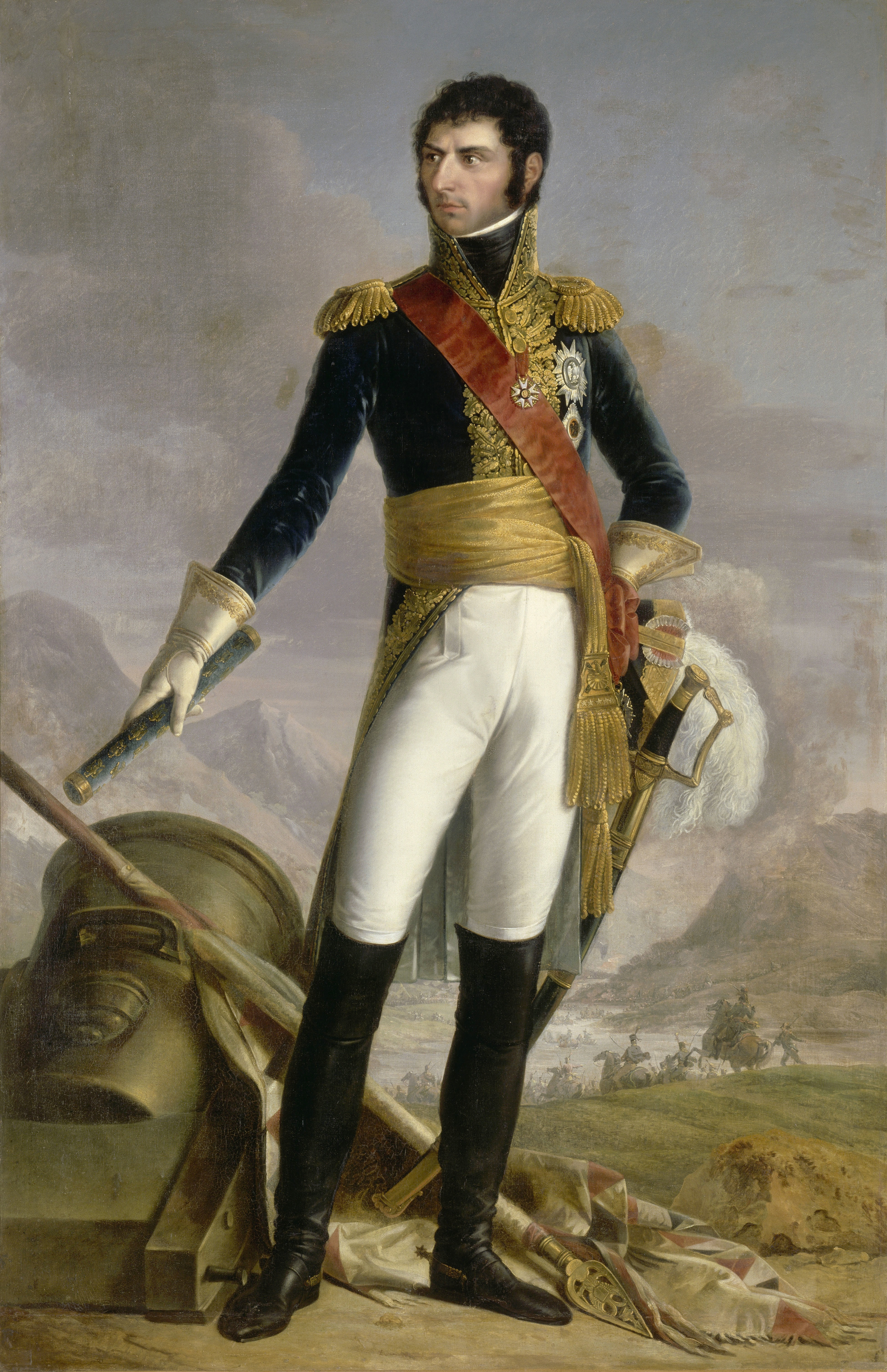
General, later Marshal Jean-Baptiste Bernadotte (1763–1844), future King Charles XIV John of Sweden

After his release, he was exiled and was sent on various overseas missions, which he performed with the greatest distinction. He was promoted to the rank of captain before returning to France.

=== Napoleonic wars ===
In 1806, he became aide-de-camp to Marshal Charles-Pierre Augereau and took part in the Prussian and Polish campaign, distinguishing himself particularly at the Battle of Jena, where he was wounded, and at the Battle of Eylau, where his horse was killed under him. Marshal Augereau, having been forced to take leave from the army as a result of his wounds, obtained that his aide-de-camp would join Marshal André Masséna, under whose orders Marbot served until the Treaties of Tilsit.

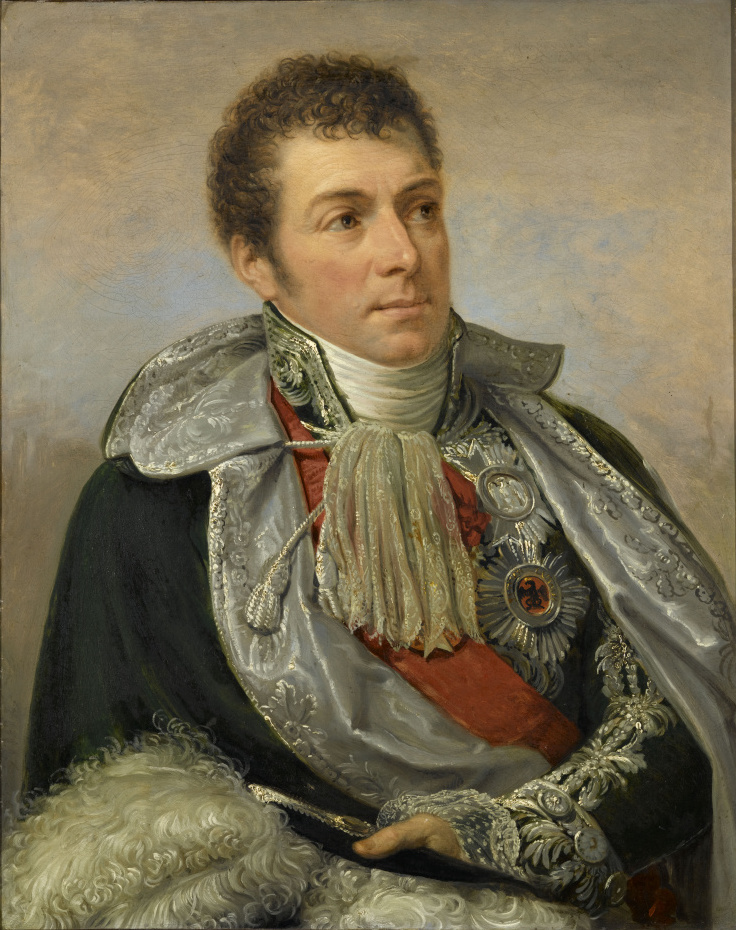
Marshal Louis-Alexandre Berthier (1753–1815), Prince of Neuchâtel

From 1808 to 1811 he fought in the Spanish campaign, serving as aide-de-camp to Marshal Jean Lannes during the Battle of Tudela on 23 November 1808. His brilliant conduct earned him a promotion to the rank of chef d'escadron (squadron leader) and he became attached to the staff of Marshal Louis-Alexandre Berthier, Prince of Neuchâtel.

After the capture of Madrid and the evacuation of the British forces at the Battle of Corunna, he left Astorga to carry letters from Emperor Napoleon I to his brother Joseph Bonaparte, who had become the King of Spain. He was injured during an ambush by guerrillas on 4 January 1809 and was imprisoned, almost dying from his wounds, in Cádiz. In February 1810, he managed to recover his liberty along with Chef d'escadron de Turenne. He reached the coast of Africa through many dangers, and finally joined Marshal Claude-Victor Perrin's corps during the Siege of Cádiz by the French forces.

Having returned from a mission in Paris, he took part in the Third Portuguese campaign as aide-de-camp to Marshal André Masséna, Prince of Essling, between 1810 and 1811.

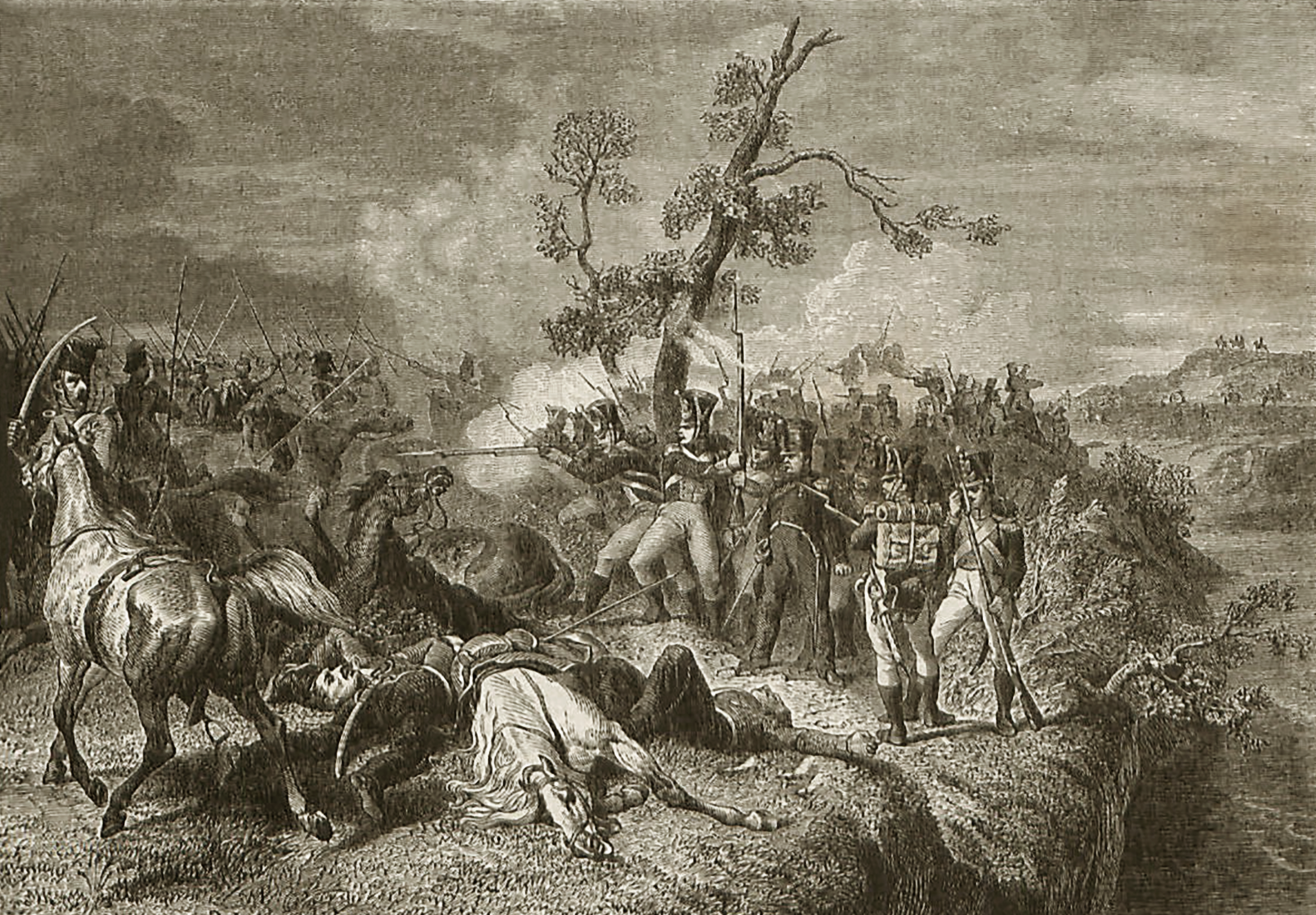
The Battle of Vitebsk (1812) during the Russian campaign

In 1812 he joined the 16th cavalry regiment of chasseurs as chef d'escadron and took part in the Russian campaign. He was wounded during the fierce combats of the Battle of Vitebsk, after having his horse killed under him. He was made prisoner by the Russian army and was sent to Saratov, where he shared the captivity of a large number of captured officers, including General de Saint-Geniès, Colonel de Saint-Mars and Captain de Ségur. He did not return to France until the end of the war in 1814, and subsequently joined the État-Major in Paris.

He became aide-de-camp to Marshal Louis-Nicolas Davout, Prince of Eckmühl, during the Hundred Days, after which he retired from active service until 1830.

=== July Monarchy ===
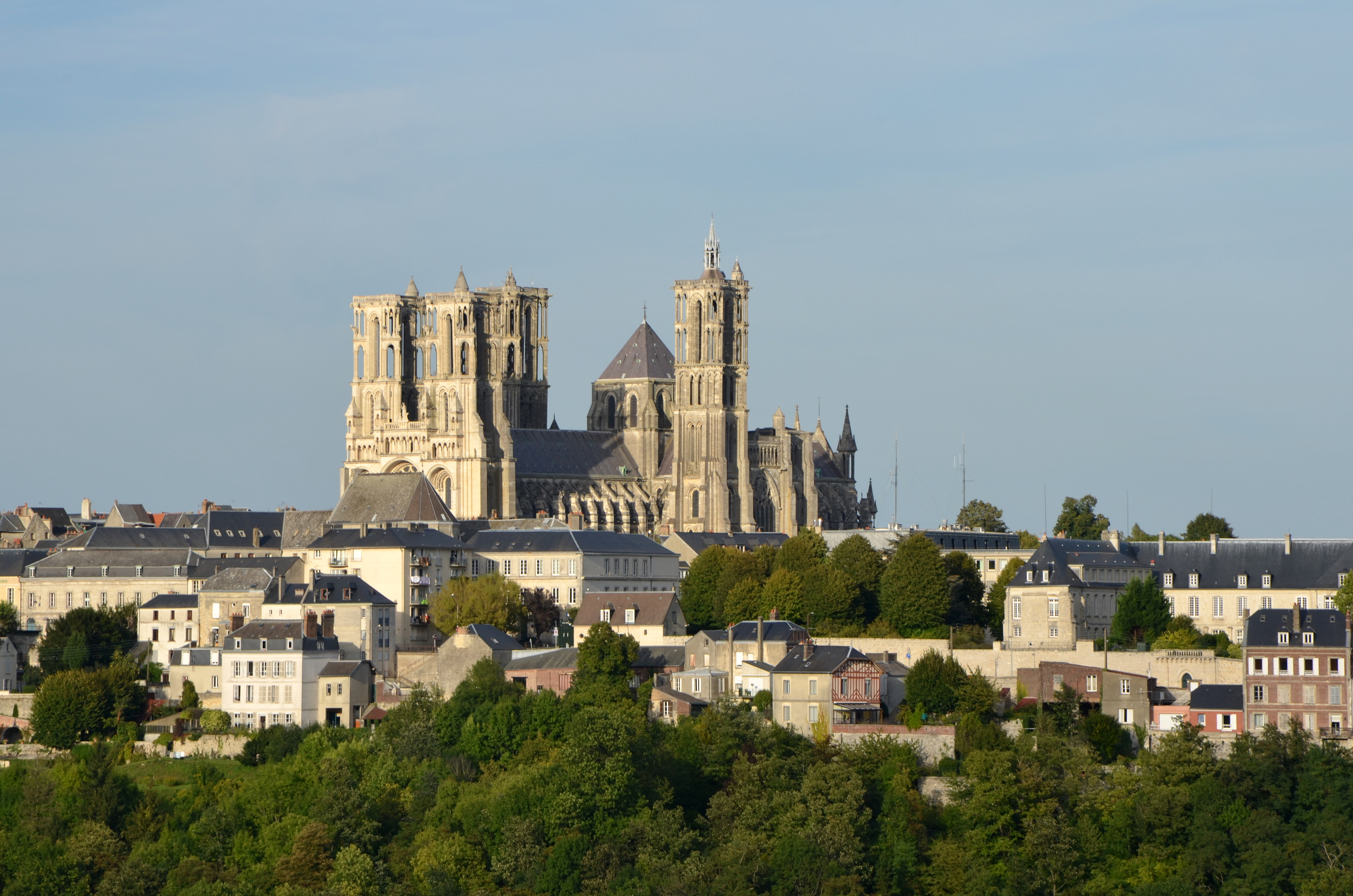
Laon, capital city of the Aisne department in northern France

During the reign of King Louis Philippe I, he attained the rank of maréchal de camp (brigadier general) on 31 December 1831, and was appointed commander of the Aisne department in the Hauts-de-France region of northern France.

He retired on 22 March 1843 and died the following year, on 2 June 1844, at Brâ near Tulle.

== Family ==
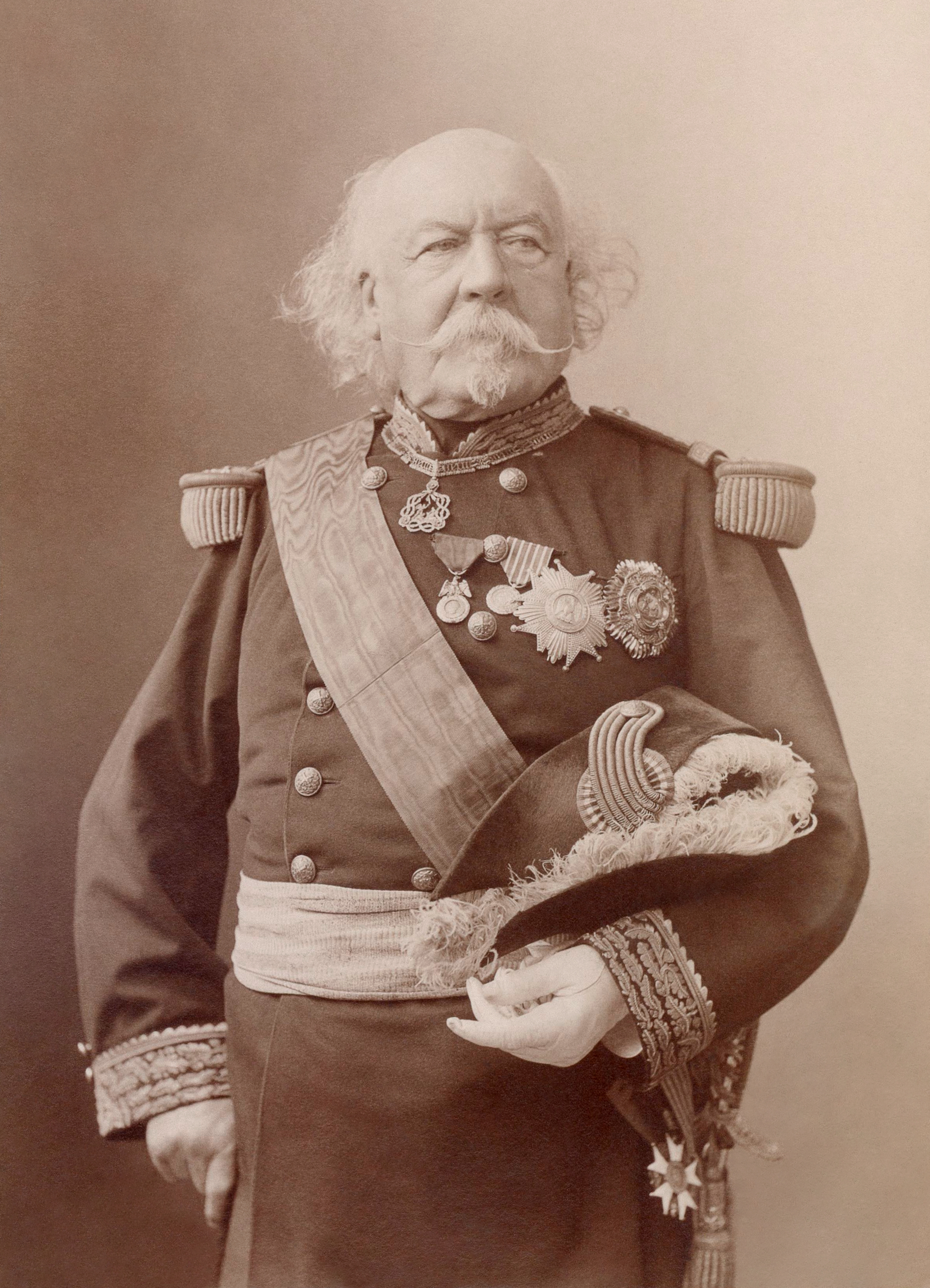
Marshal François Certain de Canrobert (1809–1895) by Nadar

His father, General Jean-Antoine Marbot, had four sons, only two whom reached adulthood: Antoine Adolphe Marcelin, the elder, and Jean-Baptiste Antoine Marcelin, the younger, lieutenant-général (divisional general) during the July Monarchy, famous for his Memoirs depicting the Napoleonic age of warfare. Through his mother, he was the cousin of François Certain de Canrobert, Marshal of France during the Second French Empire.

His marriage with Ernestine-Félicité de Moÿ de Sons, viscountess of Rives, produced no descendance.

== Decorations ==
Marbot received the following decorations:

French Empire

- National Order of the Legion of Honour:
  - Knight: 12 January 1807.

Kingdom of France

- Royal and Military Order of Saint Louis:
  - Knight: 5 November 1814.

Kingdom of France

- Royal Order of the Legion of Honour:
  - Officer: 21 March 1831.
  - Commander: 16 June 1832.

== See also ==
- Napoleonic Wars
- July Monarchy
- Marbot family
- Jean-Antoine Marbot
- Marcellin Marbot
