= Branceilles =

- Commune
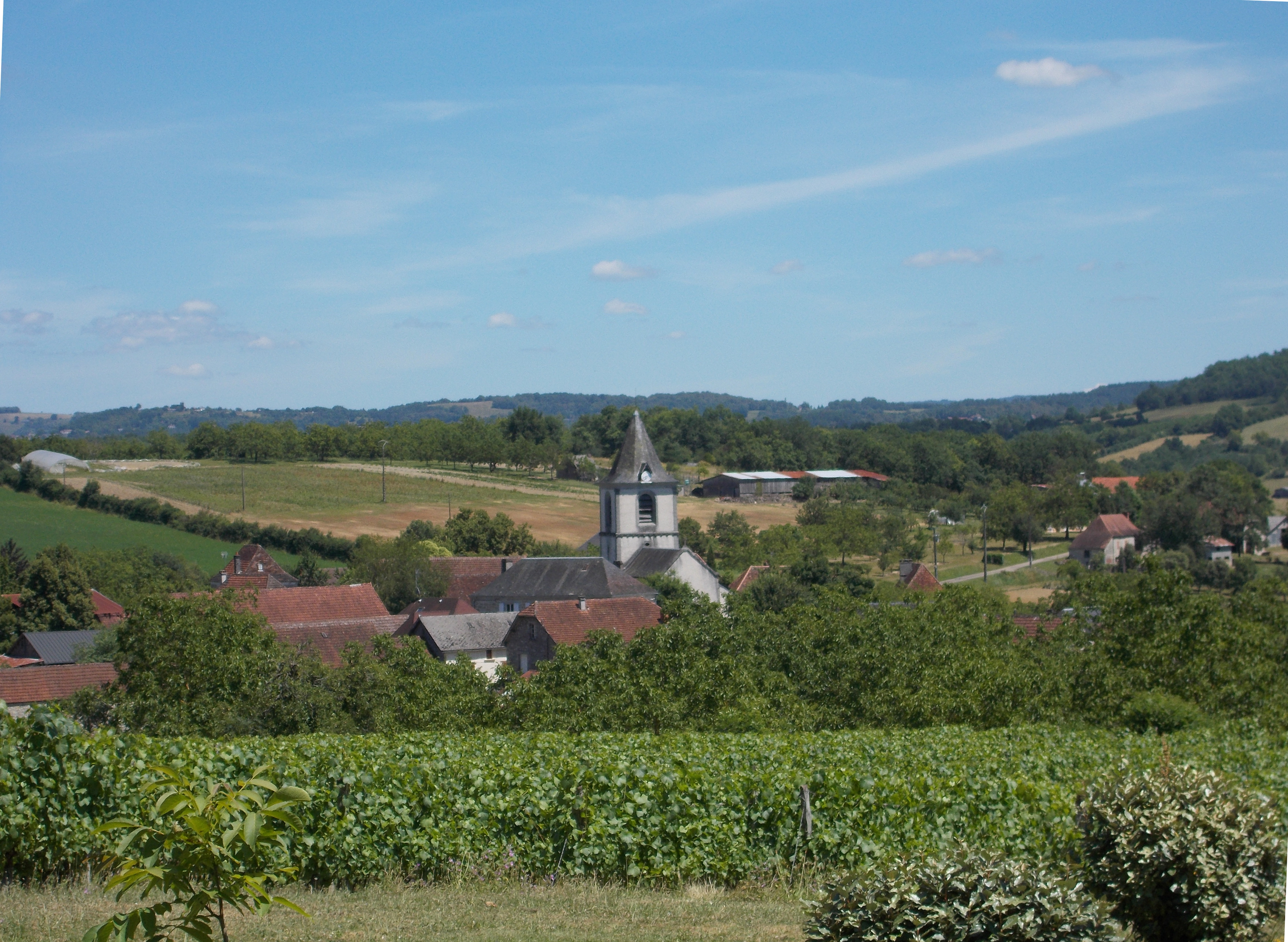
- Branceilles (2015)

- Coat of arms
- Location of Branceilles
- Location within France Location within Nouvelle-Aquitaine
- Coordinates: 45°00′43″N 1°42′39″E
- Country: France
- Region: Nouvelle-Aquitaine
- Department: Corrèze
- Arrondissement: Brive-la-Gaillarde
- Canton: Midi Corrézien
- Intercommunality: Midi Corrézien

Government
  - Mayor (2026–32): Céline Mourigal
- Area^{1}: 11.59 km^{2} (4.47 sq mi)
- Elevation: 120 m (390 ft)
- Highest elevation: 244 m (801 ft)
- Lowest elevation: 122 m (400 ft)
- Population (2023): 279
  - Density: 24.1/km^{2} (62.3/sq mi)
- Time zone: UTC+01:00 (CET)
  - Summer (DST): UTC+02:00 (CEST)
- INSEE/Postal code: 19029 /19500
- ^{1} French Land Register data, which excludes lakes, ponds, glaciers > 1 km^{2} (0.386 sq mi or 247 acres) and river estuaries.

Branceilles (French pronunciation: [bʁɑ̃sɛj]; Occitan: Brancelhas) is a commune of the Corrèze department in central France.

== History ==
The village is first mention in written texts from the 10th century when it was mention as a dependency of the Abbey of Tulle. Prior to that, a Gallo-roman villa stood at place called Saint-Martin and where a spring still exists. In the 14th century, the village had a priory that was a dependency of Vayrac. During the 1600s, Branceilles was now a barony of Lords of Pazayac, near Terrasson. The old chateau stood where the current town hall is situated.

In the late 1800s the vineyards and wine production had been destroyed by the phylloxera pest and farmers reverted to fruit and livestock farming. In 1986 a group of farmers decided to replant the vineyards. By 1990 the first grapes were harvested. In 1989 a cooperative was established called the S.C.A. de la Cave Viticole de Branceilles. They named the wine estate Mille et Une Pierres later renaming it 1001 Pierres in 2019.

== Population ==
Historical population
Year	Pop.	±% p.a.
1968	350	—
1975	308	−1.81%
1982	272	−1.76%
1990	225	−2.34%
1999	236	+0.53%
2007	247	+0.57%
2012	262	+1.19%
2017	279	+1.27%
2023	279	+0.00%
Source: INSEE

== Economy ==
The commune is one of the few wine-growing communes in the Limousin, along with Queyssac-les-Vignes, Saint-Julien-Maumont and Verneuil-sur-Vienne.

== Places and monuments ==
- Church Saint-Martin-de-Tours de Branceilles in Romanesque style, remodelled in the nineteenth century.
- Fountain of devotion.

== See also ==
- Communes of the Corrèze department
