= Maumont =

Maumont is the name of several villages in France, including:

- Maumont, a former commune of the Corrèze département, now part of Saint-Julien-Maumont
- a village on the territory of the commune of Rosiers-d'Égletons, in Corrèze
