= Sioniac =

- Commune
- Coat of arms
- Location of Sioniac
- Location within France Location within Nouvelle-Aquitaine
- Coordinates: 44°58′32″N 1°48′47″E
- Country: France
- Region: Nouvelle-Aquitaine
- Department: Corrèze
- Arrondissement: Brive-la-Gaillarde
- Canton: Midi Corrézien
- Intercommunality: Midi Corrézien

Government
  - Mayor (2020–2026): Laurent Puyjalon
- Area^{1}: 10.6 km^{2} (4.1 sq mi)
- Highest elevation: 387 m (1,270 ft)
- Lowest elevation: 193 m (633 ft)
- Population (2023): 246
  - Density: 23.2/km^{2} (60.1/sq mi)
- Time zone: UTC+01:00 (CET)
  - Summer (DST): UTC+02:00 (CEST)
- INSEE/Postal code: 19260 /19120
- ^{1} French Land Register data, which excludes lakes, ponds, glaciers > 1 km^{2} (0.386 sq mi or 247 acres) and river estuaries.

Sioniac (French pronunciation: [sjɔnjak]; Occitan: Seunhac) is a commune in the Corrèze department of Nouvelle-Aquitaine region in central France.

== Toponymy ==
The origin of the Sioniac's name today has evolved over time. From records, it is first recorded as Siuiniacum during the 9th century, the suffice -acum being Latin for the property of the man Sivinius. It is later recorded as Siviniaco vico and Siviniacus in 859 and by 1315 as Seunhac in Occitan.

== History ==
Prior to the 9th Century, little is known about the origins of Sioniac but when Rodoulf, Archbishop of Bourges established a monastery down the hill at Beaulieu-sur-Dordogne, he gave the church of Saint-Saturnin at Sioniac in May 859 to the newly established monks. In June 859, Rudolf obtained a charter from King Charles the Bald to establish a market in Sioniac. This market remained the main market for Beaulieu until the medieval period. Other sources say the market could be older as the village was positioned on an ancient north-south trading route between Puy-d'Arnac and Quercy.

== Geography ==
Sioniac lies in the southernmost part of the Corrèze department, near the river Dordogne. It is part of the functional area of Biars-sur-Cère and Saint-Céré.

== Population ==
Historical population
Year	Pop.	±% p.a.
1968	221	—
1975	187	−2.36%
1982	190	+0.23%
1990	199	+0.58%
1999	207	+0.44%
2007	240	+1.87%
2012	243	+0.25%
2017	220	−1.97%
2023	246	+1.88%
Source: INSEE

== Local culture and heritage ==
=== Religious buildings ===
==== Eglise Saint-Saturnin ====
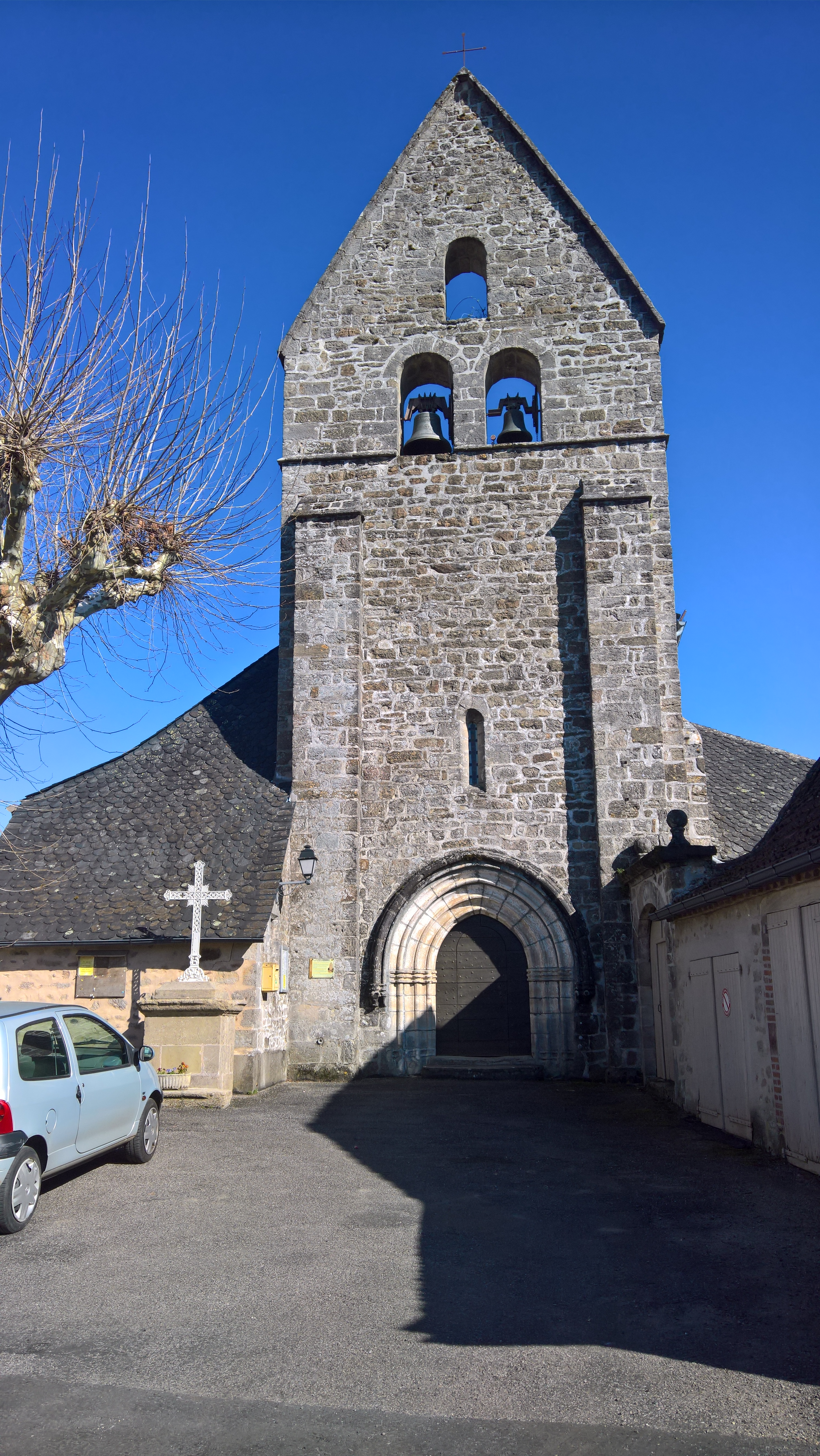
Eglise Saint-Saturnin

An older church served the area prior to the formation of the abbey at Beaulieu-sur-Dordogne. The current church was built in the 11th century, with later additions from the 12th, 15th and 17th centuries. It's a small Romanesque church with single nave with the first span a barrel vault while the other three consist of rib vaults. There are six semi-round columns with buried bases that have curved volute capitals at their tops and support double arches. Eight recessed columns with rebated capitals support the diagonal arches. It has a tall pointed gable bell tower dates which from the 15th century. It became a Historical Monument of France on 16 September 1949.

=== Other buildings ===
==== Manoir de Doumazac ====
Now a private property, was an old hunting lodge of the Lords of d'Estresse. It was built in the 13th century and extensions added in the 16th century.

== See also ==
- Communes of the Corrèze department
