= Saillac =

Saillac may refer to the following places in France:

- Saillac, Corrèze, a commune in the department of Corrèze
- Saillac, Lot, a commune in the department of Lot
