= Saint-Bazile-de-Meyssac =

- Commune
- Coat of arms
- Location of Saint-Bazile-de-Meyssac
- Location within France Location within Nouvelle-Aquitaine
- Coordinates: 45°03′06″N 1°43′38″E
- Country: France
- Region: Nouvelle-Aquitaine
- Department: Corrèze
- Arrondissement: Brive-la-Gaillarde
- Canton: Midi Corrézien

Government
  - Mayor (2020–2026): Éric Ciscard
- Area^{1}: 4.47 km^{2} (1.73 sq mi)
- Highest elevation: 338 m (1,109 ft)
- Lowest elevation: 164 m (538 ft)
- Population (2023): 142
  - Density: 31.8/km^{2} (82.3/sq mi)
- Time zone: UTC+01:00 (CET)
  - Summer (DST): UTC+02:00 (CEST)
- INSEE/Postal code: 19184 /19500
- ^{1} French Land Register data, which excludes lakes, ponds, glaciers > 1 km^{2} (0.386 sq mi or 247 acres) and river estuaries.

Saint-Bazile-de-Meyssac (French pronunciation: [sɛ̃ bazil də mɛsak], literally Saint-Bazile of Meyssac; Occitan: Sent Mauvire) is a commune in the Corrèze department in central France.

== Population ==
Historical population
Year	Pop.	±% p.a.
1968	191	—
1975	168	−1.82%
1982	148	−1.79%
1990	140	−0.69%
1999	152	+0.92%
2007	156	+0.33%
2012	143	−1.73%
2017	130	−1.89%
2023	142	+1.48%
Source: INSEE

== See also ==
- Communes of the Corrèze department
