= Albignac =

- Commune
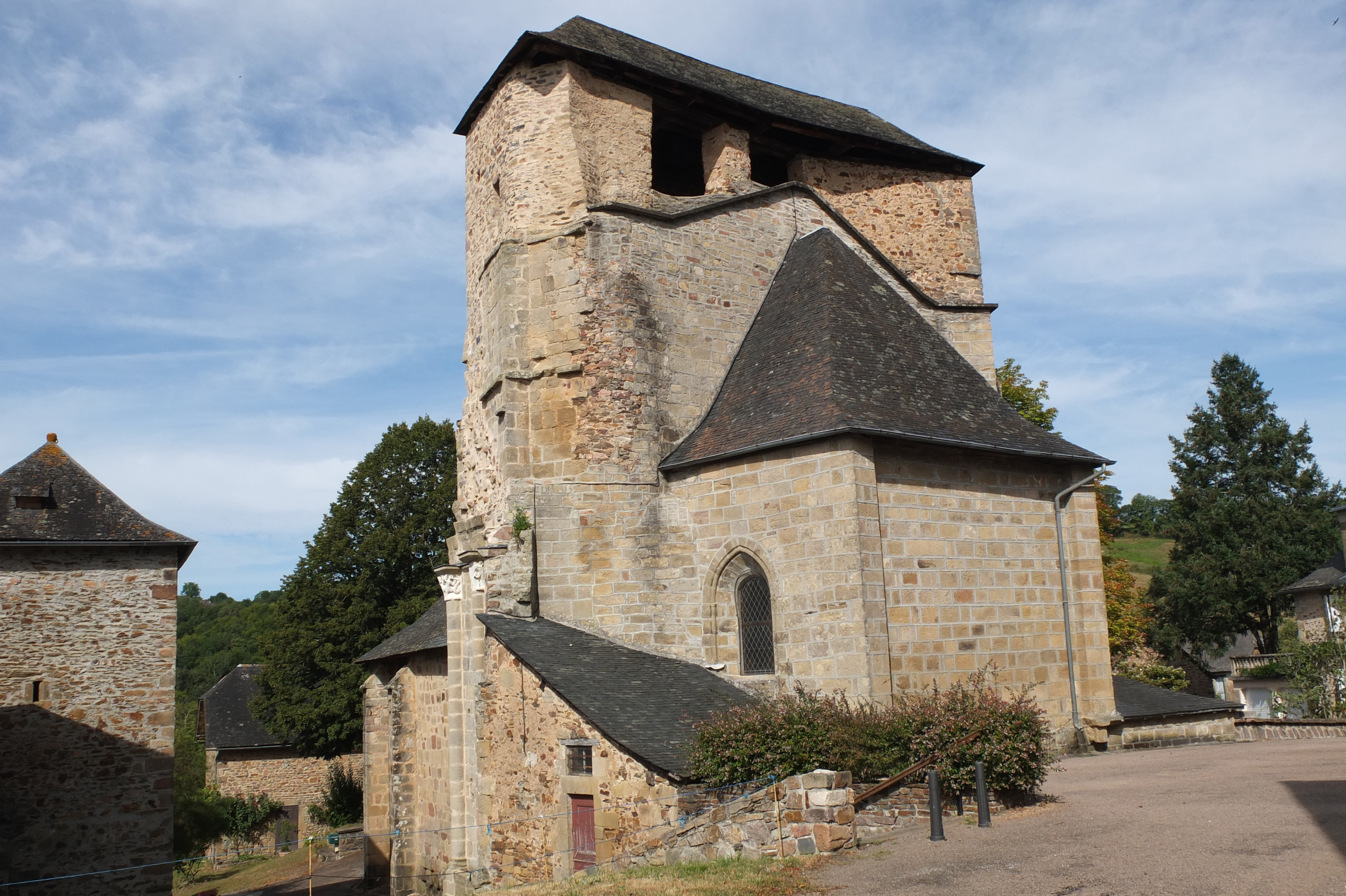
- The church of Our Lady, in Albignac

- Coat of arms
- Location of Albignac
- Location within France Location within Nouvelle-Aquitaine
- Coordinates: 45°08′24″N 1°40′43″E
- Country: France
- Region: Nouvelle-Aquitaine
- Department: Corrèze
- Arrondissement: Brive-la-Gaillarde
- Canton: Midi Corrézien
- Intercommunality: Midi Corrézien

Government
  - Mayor (2020–2026): Alain Simonet
- Area^{1}: 9.74 km^{2} (3.76 sq mi)
- Elevation: 340 m (1,120 ft)
- Highest elevation: 509 m (1,670 ft)
- Lowest elevation: 154 m (505 ft)
- Population (2023): 236
  - Density: 24.2/km^{2} (62.8/sq mi)
- Time zone: UTC+01:00 (CET)
  - Summer (DST): UTC+02:00 (CEST)
- INSEE/Postal code: 19003 /19190
- ^{1} French Land Register data, which excludes lakes, ponds, glaciers > 1 km^{2} (0.386 sq mi or 247 acres) and river estuaries.

Albignac (French pronunciation: [albiɲak]; Occitan: Albinhac) is a commune in the Corrèze department in the Nouvelle-Aquitaine region of central France.

== Toponymy ==
Albignac comes from the Latin name of a man called Albinus or Albinius.

It was called Albiniaco in 1095.

== History ==
The 11th century Albignac had a priory which belonged to the abbey of Saint-Michel-de-la-Cluse in Piedmont. In the 15th century the priory depended on the Coyroux Priory at Aubazine.

In the 12th century, Albignac depended on the Viscount of Gimel under the guidance of the Viscounts of Turrene.

== Geography ==
Albignac is located some 15 km east of Brive-la-Gaillarde and 20 km south by south-east of Saint-Germain-les-Vergnes. Access to the commune from the south is by the D175 road which branches from the D921 east of Lanteuil. The D175 goes to the village of Albignac then continues north to the hamlet of La Borie and joins the D130 inside the commune. The D130 enters the commune from Aubazine in the north by a circuitous route through La Viallard and exiting the commune in the south-east towards Fontourcy. The D14 road also runs from north to south inside the western side of the commune. There is an extensive network of country roads in the commune. The commune is mixed farmland and forest.

A number of streams cross the commune feeding into the Roanne with the Donjou stream traversing the commune from east to west into the Roanne river which forms both the western and southern borders of the commune. The Roanne flows north into the Correze river at Confolens.

=== Hamlets ===
There are a substantial number of hamlets in the commune. These are:

- Auzelou
- Bayle
- Boisgrand
- la Borie
- la Borie-Blanche
- le Bournazel
- Chantegril
- la Crozade
- l'Evescat
- Flaugeat
- le Juge
- Miallet
- Ombinat
- Pierrefiche
- Plainefage
- le Prieur
- Puy-de-Bayle
- Quicolagne
- Rhode
- la Rivière
- les Sautes
- la Tronche
- la Verde
- le Viallard
- la Voûte

== Population ==
The inhabitants of the commune are known as Albignacois or Albignacoises in French.

Historical population
Year	Pop.	±% p.a.
1968	260	—
1975	226	−1.98%
1982	255	+1.74%
1990	263	+0.39%
1999	258	−0.21%
2007	258	+0.00%
2012	238	−1.60%
2017	254	+1.31%
2023	236	−1.22%
Source: INSEE

=== Heraldry ===
Arms of Albignac	Blazon: Azure, a cross of Or at 1 and 4 a roundel the same, at 2 and 3 a tusk of a boar argent.

== Local government ==
List of Successive Mayors of Albignac

From	To	Name
1865	1870	Jean-Barthélémi Juin Lamiraudie
2001	2008	Jean-Pierre Brousse
2008	2026	Alain Simonet

== Sites and Monuments ==
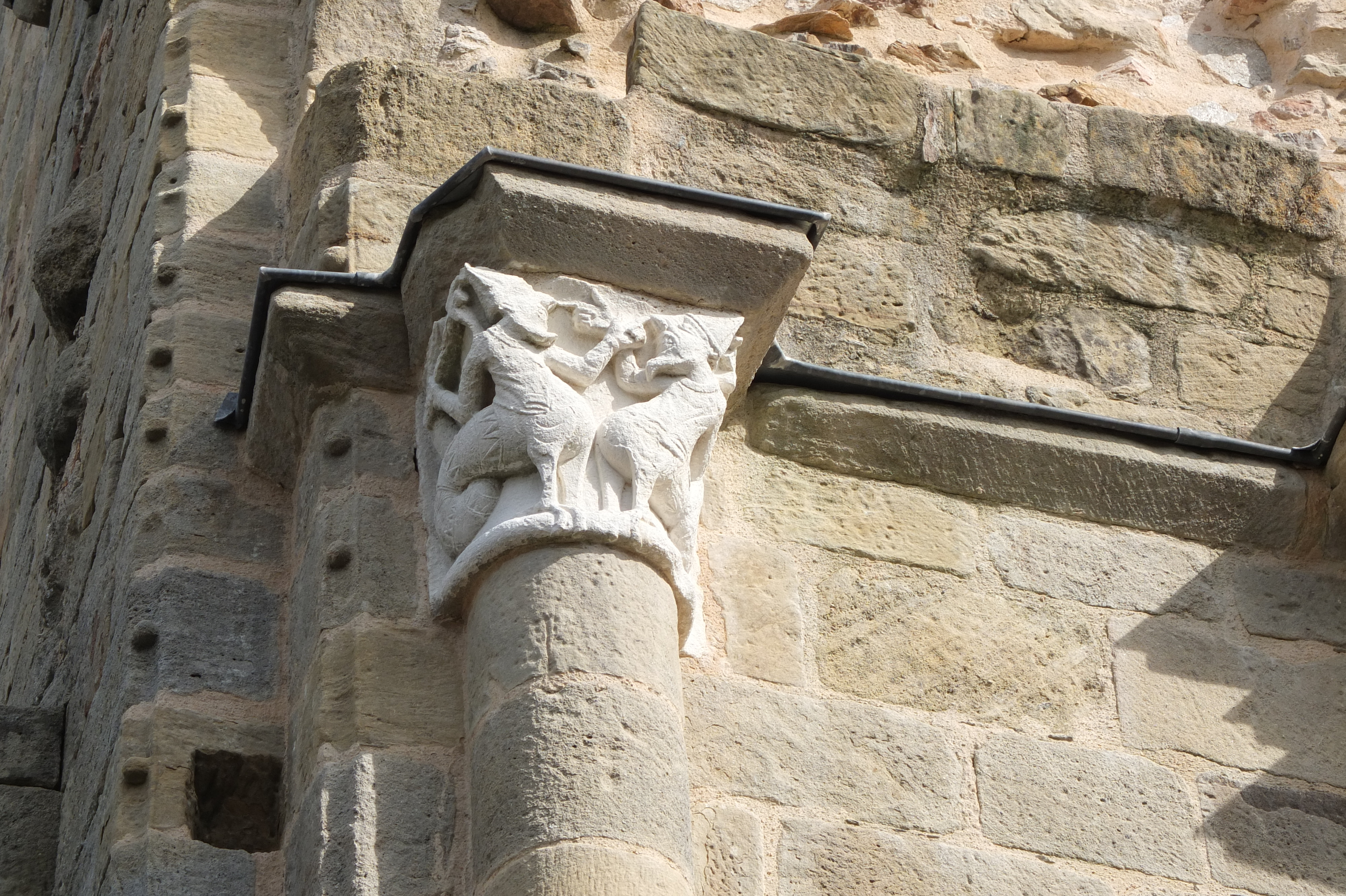
The capital of the Church

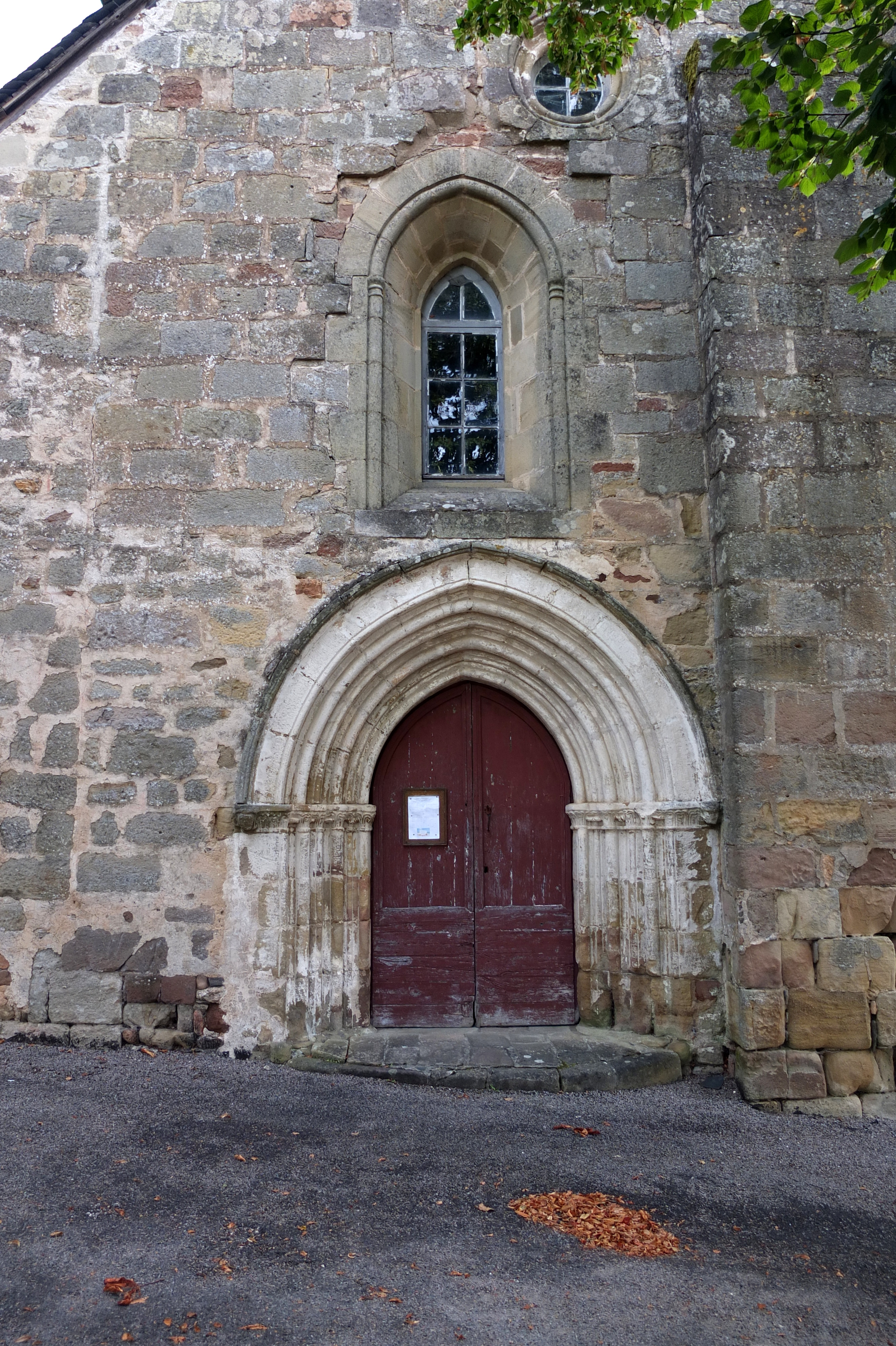
The Door of the church from the 13th century

- The Church of Notre-Dame (12th century) is registered as an historical monument. It has a bell tower, nave, choir, capitals, and bas-reliefs in stone. It contains several items which are registered as historical objects:
  - An Altar, 2 banks of Altar seating, Tabernacle, and Console (19th century)
  - A Capital converted to a Stoup (12th century)
  - A Bronze Bell (1601)
- Remains from Prehistory and Antiquity
- Tower of the old priory with a monumental spiral staircase

== Notable people linked to the commune ==
- Jean-Baptiste Laumond, (born at Albignac on 22 August 1865 and died 18 November 1957 in Aubazine), Mayor of Aubazine, councilor general, MP, Provost of Andorra

== See also ==
- Communes of the Corrèze department
