= Beynat =

- Commune
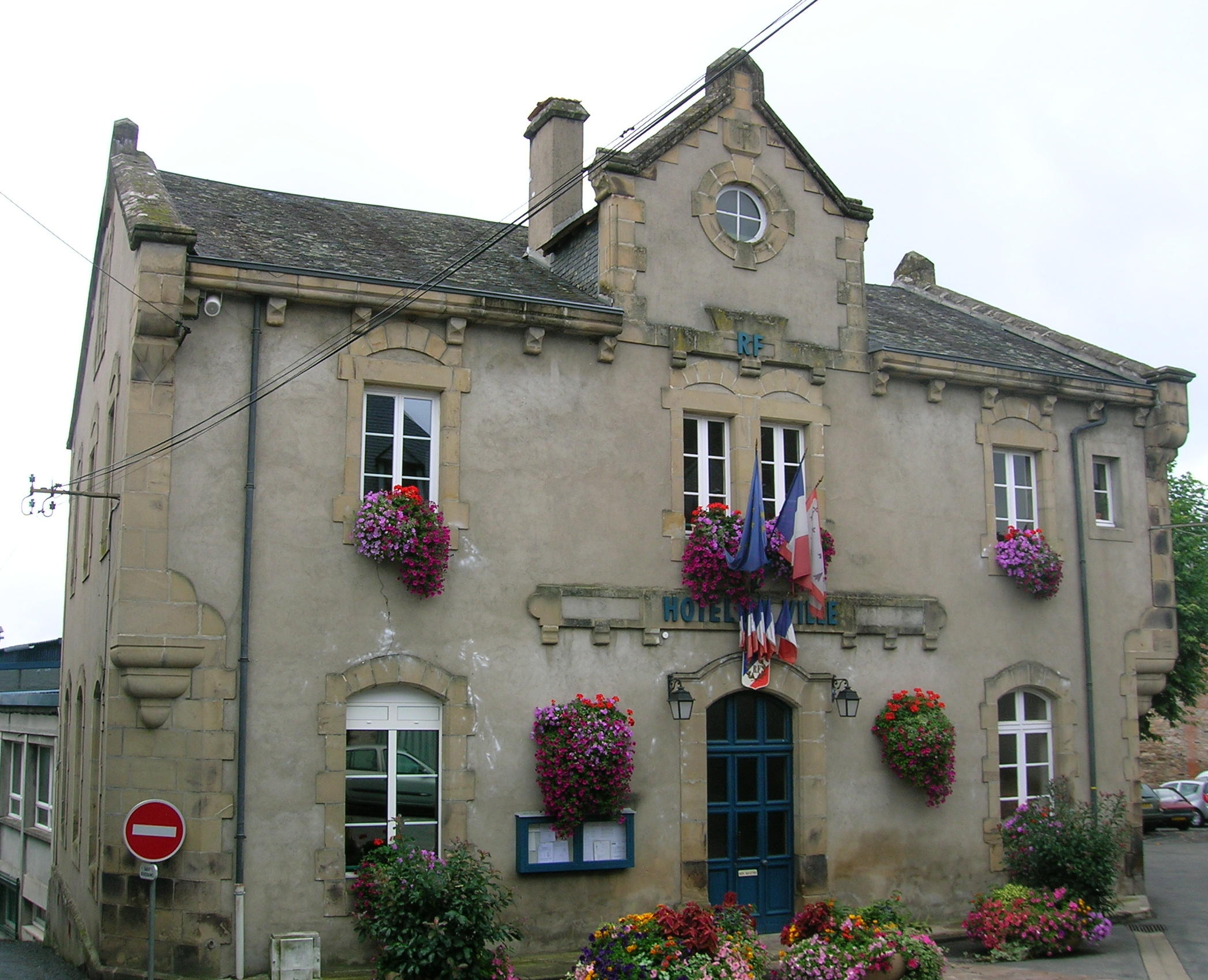
- Town hall

- Coat of arms
- Location of Beynat
- Location within France Location within Nouvelle-Aquitaine
- Coordinates: 45°07′26″N 1°43′26″E
- Country: France
- Region: Nouvelle-Aquitaine
- Department: Corrèze
- Arrondissement: Brive-la-Gaillarde
- Canton: Midi Corrézien
- Intercommunality: Midi Corrézien

Government
  - Mayor (2026–32): Jean-Michel Monteil
- Area^{1}: 34.84 km^{2} (13.45 sq mi)
- Highest elevation: 581 m (1,906 ft)
- Lowest elevation: 189 m (620 ft)
- Population (2023): 1,318
  - Density: 37.83/km^{2} (97.98/sq mi)
- Time zone: UTC+01:00 (CET)
  - Summer (DST): UTC+02:00 (CEST)
- INSEE/Postal code: 19023 /19190
- ^{1} French Land Register data, which excludes lakes, ponds, glaciers > 1 km^{2} (0.386 sq mi or 247 acres) and river estuaries.

Beynat (French pronunciation: [bɛna]; Occitan: Béinat) is a commune of the Corrèze department in central France.

== History ==
The commune was found to have been inhabited during the Merovingian period with discovery of coinage from that period. During the end of the Carolingian period, the 900s, a viguerie controlled the commune. By the 1200s, the commune was under the control of the Viscounts of Turenne with a castle near the church. A military commandery, the Order of Malta settled at the Puy de Noix.

On April 2, 1944, the Brehmer division rounded up 35 people who were deported.

On July 29, 1944, in the village of Perrier, a group of maquisards was ambushed by a motorized company of the 95th German Security Regiment.

== Population ==
Historical population
Year	Pop.	±% p.a.
1968	1,336	—
1975	1,132	−2.34%
1982	1,101	−0.40%
1990	1,068	−0.38%
1999	1,149	+0.82%
2007	1,225	+0.80%
2012	1,272	+0.76%
2017	1,258	−0.22%
2023	1,318	+0.78%
Source: INSEE

== Local culture and heritage ==
=== Natural heritage ===
- L'étang de Miel.

=== Cultural heritage ===
- The dolmen known as the fairies' hut (Cabane de la Fée) is located near the hamlet of Brugeilles. Classified as a historic monument in 1910.
- L'église Saint-Pierre-ès-Liens, a church from the twelfth and fifteenth centuries, houses many paintings and objects. including a painting by Charles-Henri Michel.
- During the 1960s and 1970s, the Château de Sabeau was a holiday camp centre belonging to the Astra Calvé company, which sold the castle in 1985. It is now owned by Edencourt SA, a real estate investment company. Around this castle, a project turned it into a holiday village, 60% of the accommodation would be accessible to people with reduced mobility. The castle opened its doors on 4 August 2007.
- In the village of Perrier, there is a monument in honour of young French Resistance members who fell in June 1944.
- Puy de Noix, former Knights Templar and then Hospitaller commandery.

=== Personalities linked to the commune ===
- Pierre Dumoulin-Borie (1808-1838), priest of the foreign missions of Paris, executed in Đồng Hới, Tonkin, was canonized in 1988.
- François Marty (1901-1944), priest, prison chaplain and resistance fighter.
- Victor Feltrin (1909-1993) was a sculptor who lived in the commune.
- Kurt Cobain (1967-1994) before becoming famous, the singer spent several summer stays during his childhood with his grandparents in the town.

== See also ==
- Communes of the Corrèze department
