= Tudeils =

- Commune
- Coat of arms
- Location of Tudeils
- Location within France Location within Nouvelle-Aquitaine
- Coordinates: 45°03′01″N 1°47′39″E
- Country: France
- Region: Nouvelle-Aquitaine
- Department: Corrèze
- Arrondissement: Brive-la-Gaillarde
- Canton: Midi Corrézien

Government
  - Mayor (2020–2026): Michaël Schuller
- Area^{1}: 9.39 km^{2} (3.63 sq mi)
- Highest elevation: 462 m (1,516 ft)
- Lowest elevation: 147 m (482 ft)
- Population (2023): 268
  - Density: 28.5/km^{2} (73.9/sq mi)
- Time zone: UTC+01:00 (CET)
  - Summer (DST): UTC+02:00 (CEST)
- INSEE/Postal code: 19271 /19120
- ^{1} French Land Register data, which excludes lakes, ponds, glaciers > 1 km^{2} (0.386 sq mi or 247 acres) and river estuaries.

Tudeils (French pronunciation: [tydɛj]; Occitan: Tudelh) is a commune in the Corrèze department in central France.

== Population ==
Historical population
Year	Pop.	±% p.a.
1968	347	—
1975	317	−1.28%
1982	277	−1.91%
1990	263	−0.65%
1999	225	−1.72%
2007	242	+0.91%
2012	248	+0.49%
2017	245	−0.24%
2023	268	+1.51%
Source: INSEE

== See also ==
- Communes of the Corrèze department
