= Nonards =

- Commune
- Coat of arms
- Location of Nonards
- Location within France Location within Nouvelle-Aquitaine
- Coordinates: 45°01′33″N 1°47′45″E
- Country: France
- Region: Nouvelle-Aquitaine
- Department: Corrèze
- Arrondissement: Brive-la-Gaillarde
- Canton: Midi Corrézien

Government
  - Mayor (2020–2026): Daniel Roche
- Area^{1}: 11.1 km^{2} (4.3 sq mi)
- Elevation: 180 m (590 ft)
- Highest elevation: 451 m (1,480 ft)
- Lowest elevation: 152 m (499 ft)
- Population (2023): 482
  - Density: 43.4/km^{2} (112/sq mi)
- Time zone: UTC+01:00 (CET)
  - Summer (DST): UTC+02:00 (CEST)
- INSEE/Postal code: 19152 /19120
- ^{1} French Land Register data, which excludes lakes, ponds, glaciers > 1 km^{2} (0.386 sq mi or 247 acres) and river estuaries.

Nonards (French pronunciation: [nɔnaʁ]; Occitan: Nonars) is a commune in the Corrèze department in central France.

== Population ==
Historical population
| Year | Pop. | ±% p.a. |
|---|---|---|
| 1968 | 434 | — |
| 1975 | 363 | −2.52% |
| 1982 | 359 | −0.16% |
| 1990 | 353 | −0.21% |
| 1999 | 334 | −0.61% |
| 2007 | 401 | +2.31% |
| 2012 | 471 | +3.27% |
| 2017 | 447 | −1.04% |
| 2023 | 482 | +1.26% |
Source: INSEE

== See also ==
- Communes of the Corrèze department
