= Chenailler-Mascheix =

- Commune
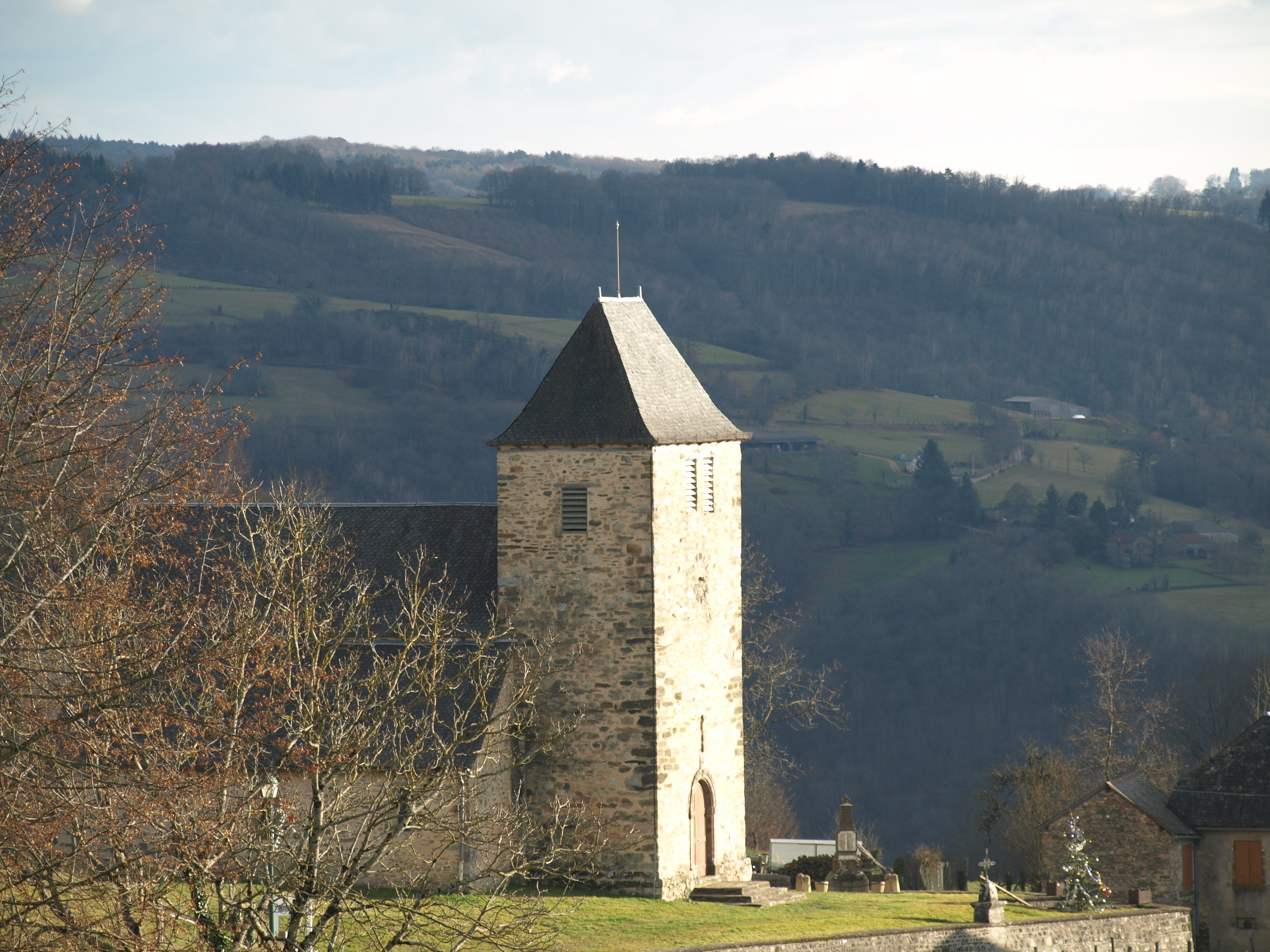
- The church in Chenailler-Mascheix

- Coat of arms
- Location of Chenailler-Mascheix
- Location within France Location within Nouvelle-Aquitaine
- Coordinates: 45°03′19″N 1°50′27″E
- Country: France
- Region: Nouvelle-Aquitaine
- Department: Corrèze
- Arrondissement: Brive-la-Gaillarde
- Canton: Midi Corrézien

Government
  - Mayor (2020–2026): Guy Chassagne
- Area^{1}: 15.82 km^{2} (6.11 sq mi)
- Elevation: 400 m (1,300 ft)
- Highest elevation: 544 m (1,785 ft)
- Lowest elevation: 147 m (482 ft)
- Population (2023): 215
  - Density: 13.6/km^{2} (35.2/sq mi)
- Time zone: UTC+01:00 (CET)
  - Summer (DST): UTC+02:00 (CEST)
- INSEE/Postal code: 19054 /19120
- ^{1} French Land Register data, which excludes lakes, ponds, glaciers > 1 km^{2} (0.386 sq mi or 247 acres) and river estuaries.

Chenailler-Mascheix (French pronunciation: [ʃənaje maʃɛ]; Occitan: Chanaliech Mascher) is a commune in the Corrèze department in central France.

== History ==
Originally two separate communes of Chenailler and Mascheix, they were merged into one commune in 1843. The two villages were part of the Viscounty of Turenne from the 13th century until the 18th century.

== Population ==
Historical population
Year	Pop.	±% p.a.
1968	288	—
1975	245	−2.28%
1982	221	−1.46%
1990	203	−1.06%
1999	170	−1.95%
2007	160	−0.75%
2012	175	+1.81%
2017	208	+3.52%
2023	215	+0.55%
Source: INSEE

== Places and monuments ==
- Chapelle de Saint-Jean-Baptiste - a chapel in Mascheix with a cemetery, from 15th century and remodeled in 19th century, in the Maltese style with a walled bell tower and slate roof.
- Eglise Saint-Loup de Chenailler-Mascheix

== See also ==
- Communes of the Corrèze department
