= Ménoire =

- Commune
- Coat of arms
- Location of Ménoire
- Location within France Location within Nouvelle-Aquitaine
- Coordinates: 45°06′05″N 1°47′38″E
- Country: France
- Region: Nouvelle-Aquitaine
- Department: Corrèze
- Arrondissement: Brive-la-Gaillarde
- Canton: Midi Corrézien

Government
  - Mayor (2020–2026): Christophe Lissajoux
- Area^{1}: 6.43 km^{2} (2.48 sq mi)
- Elevation: 500 m (1,600 ft)
- Highest elevation: 590 m (1,940 ft)
- Lowest elevation: 398 m (1,306 ft)
- Population (2023): 132
  - Density: 20.5/km^{2} (53.2/sq mi)
- Time zone: UTC+01:00 (CET)
  - Summer (DST): UTC+02:00 (CEST)
- INSEE/Postal code: 19132 /19190
- ^{1} French Land Register data, which excludes lakes, ponds, glaciers > 1 km^{2} (0.386 sq mi or 247 acres) and river estuaries.

Ménoire (French pronunciation: [menwaʁ]; Occitan: Menoire) is a commune in the Corrèze department in central France.

== Population ==
Historical population
Year	Pop.	±% p.a.
1968	114	—
1975	94	−2.72%
1982	87	−1.10%
1990	85	−0.29%
1999	78	−0.95%
2007	83	+0.78%
2012	97	+3.17%
2017	118	+4.00%
2023	132	+1.89%
Source: INSEE

== See also ==
- Communes of the Corrèze department
