= Lostanges =

- Commune
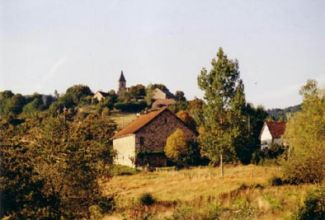
- A general view of Lostanges

- Coat of arms
- Location of Lostanges
- Location within France Location within Nouvelle-Aquitaine
- Coordinates: 45°03′47″N 1°45′51″E
- Country: France
- Region: Nouvelle-Aquitaine
- Department: Corrèze
- Arrondissement: Brive-la-Gaillarde
- Canton: Midi Corrézien
- Intercommunality: Midi Corrézien

Government
  - Mayor (2020–2026): Jérôme Madeleine
- Area^{1}: 9.46 km^{2} (3.65 sq mi)
- Elevation: 275 m (902 ft)
- Highest elevation: 515 m (1,690 ft)
- Lowest elevation: 146 m (479 ft)
- Population (2023): 152
  - Density: 16.1/km^{2} (41.6/sq mi)
- Time zone: UTC+01:00 (CET)
  - Summer (DST): UTC+02:00 (CEST)
- INSEE/Postal code: 19119 /19500
- ^{1} French Land Register data, which excludes lakes, ponds, glaciers > 1 km^{2} (0.386 sq mi or 247 acres) and river estuaries.

Lostanges (French pronunciation: [lɔstɑ̃ʒ]; Occitan: Lostanjas) is a commune in the Corrèze department in central France.

== Population ==
Historical population
Year	Pop.	±% p.a.
1968	171	—
1975	140	−2.82%
1982	147	+0.70%
1990	127	−1.81%
1999	134	+0.60%
2007	129	−0.47%
2012	128	−0.16%
2017	139	+1.66%
2023	152	+1.50%
Source: INSEE

== See also ==
- Communes of the Corrèze department
