= Ligneyrac =

- Commune
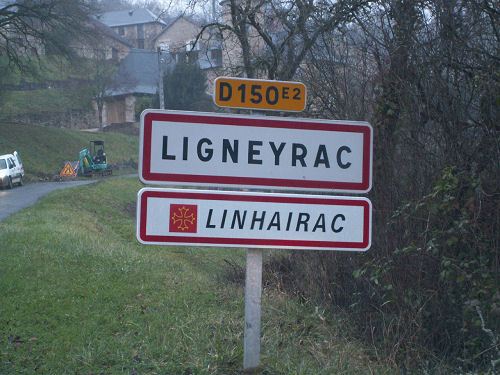
- A bilingual road sign, entering Ligneyrac

- Coat of arms
- Location of Ligneyrac
- Location within France Location within Nouvelle-Aquitaine
- Coordinates: 45°03′10″N 1°37′10″E
- Country: France
- Region: Nouvelle-Aquitaine
- Department: Corrèze
- Arrondissement: Brive-la-Gaillarde
- Canton: Midi Corrézien
- Intercommunality: Midi Corrézien

Government
  - Mayor (2026–32): Nathalie Duranton
- Area^{1}: 8.36 km^{2} (3.23 sq mi)
- Elevation: 240 m (790 ft)
- Highest elevation: 332 m (1,089 ft)
- Lowest elevation: 138 m (453 ft)
- Population (2023): 290
  - Density: 35/km^{2} (90/sq mi)
- Demonym(s): Ligneyracois, Ligneyracoises
- Time zone: UTC+01:00 (CET)
  - Summer (DST): UTC+02:00 (CEST)
- INSEE/Postal code: 19115 /19500
- ^{1} French Land Register data, which excludes lakes, ponds, glaciers > 1 km^{2} (0.386 sq mi or 247 acres) and river estuaries.

Ligneyrac (French pronunciation: [liɲeʁak]; Occitan: Linhairac) is a commune in the Corrèze department in central France.

== Toponymy ==
The name of the commune refers to Linarius, a Latin character to which the suffix -acum is attached, indicating the "domain of Linarius".

The commune is called Linhairac in Occitan.

== Population ==
Historical population
Year	Pop.	±% p.a.
1968	356	—
1975	267	−4.03%
1982	298	+1.58%
1990	284	−0.60%
1999	283	−0.04%
2007	296	+0.56%
2012	319	+1.51%
2017	299	−1.29%
2023	290	−0.51%
Source: INSEE

== Local culture and heritage ==
=== Places and monuments ===
- Église Saint-Cyr-et-Sainte-Julitte – a romanesque church of the 12th century, with its oratory, listed as a historical monument since 1928;
- Château du Peuch – probably dating from the 15th century, listed since 1998;
- Château des Roberts;
- Château de la Rue – from the 16th and 17th centuries, a historical monument listed for its facades and roofs since 1965;
- Fontaine Saint-Georges and its Saint-Eutrope spring.
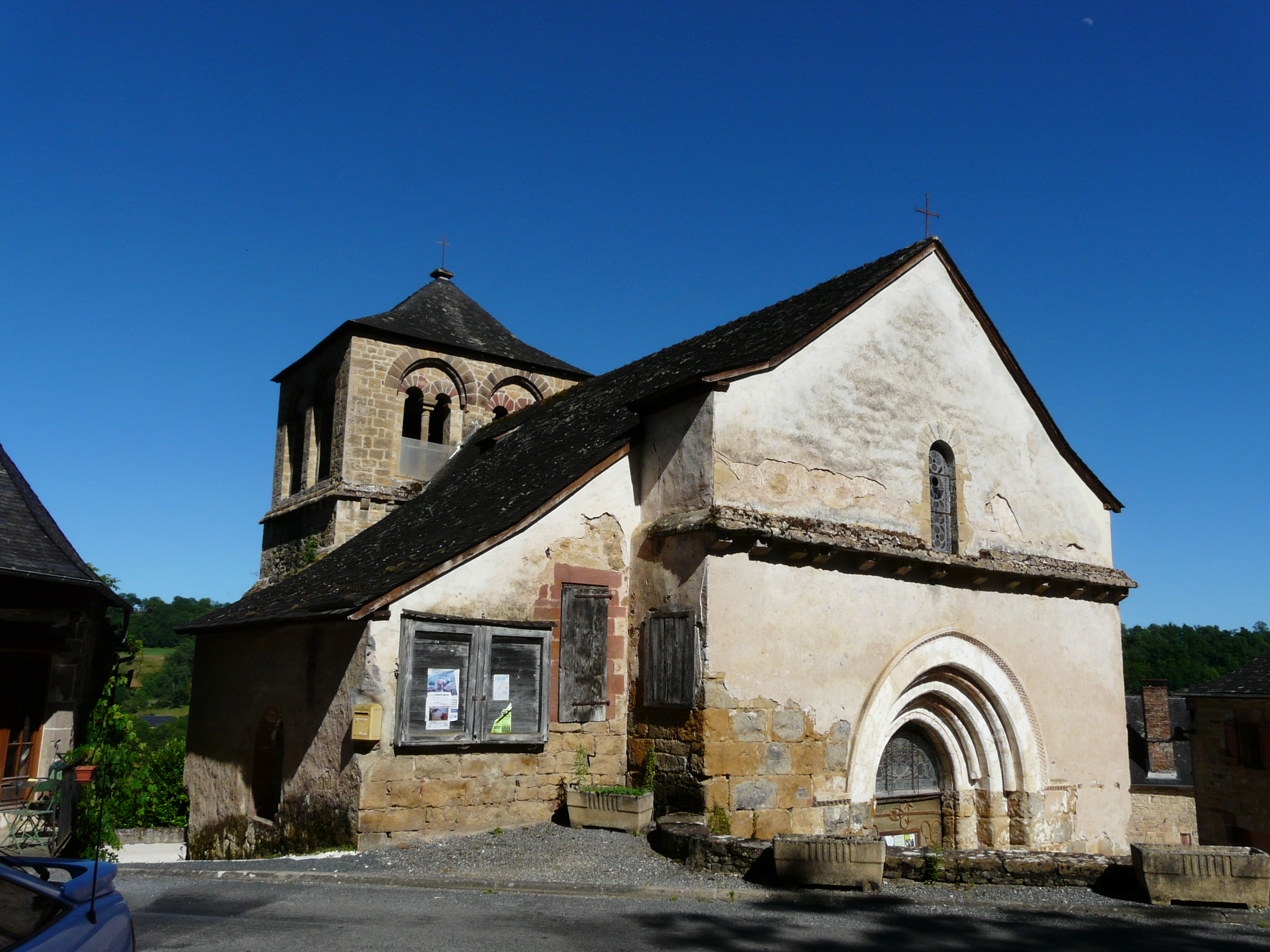
L'église Saint-Cyr-et-Sainte-Julitte.

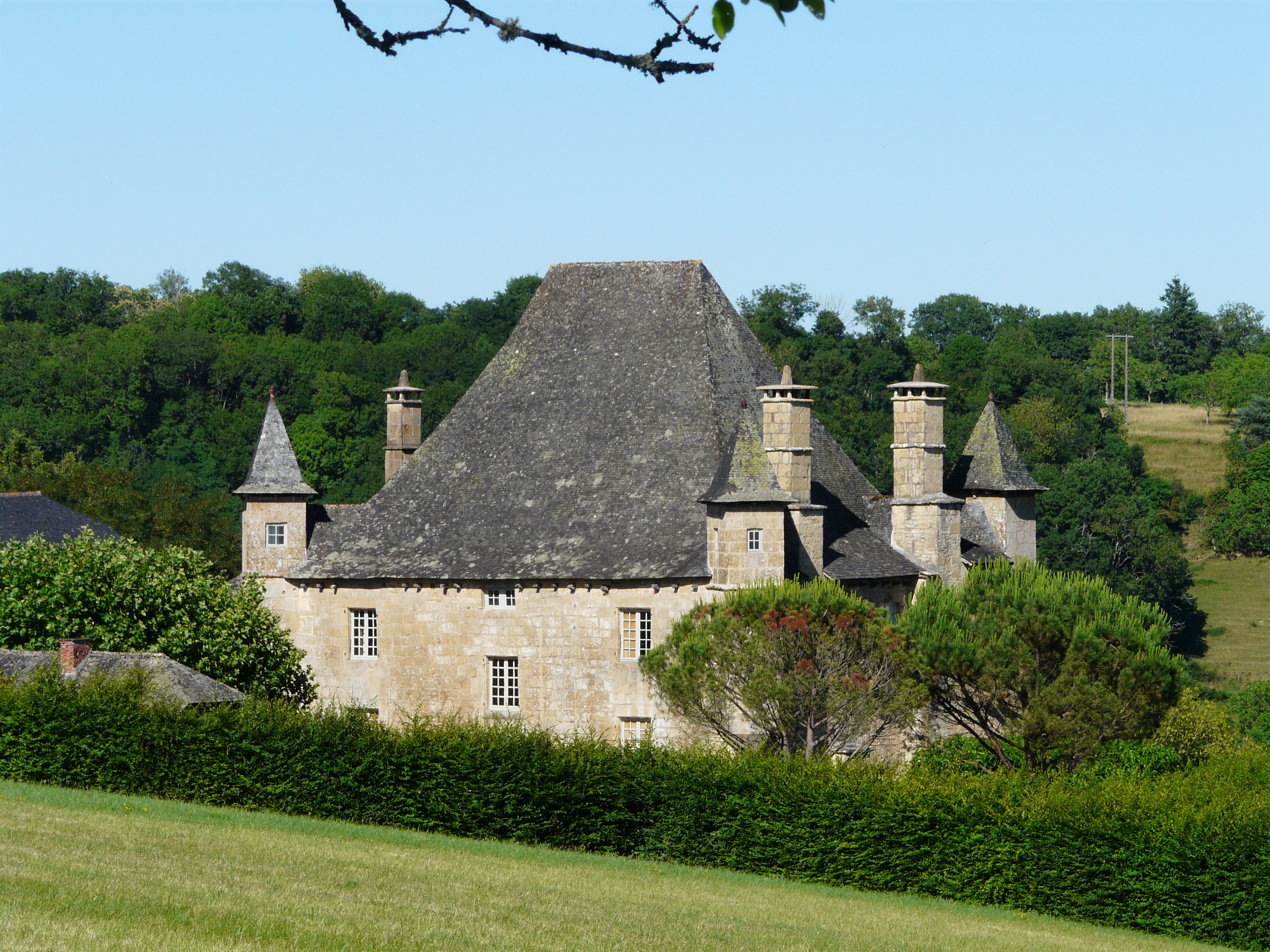
Château de la Rue.

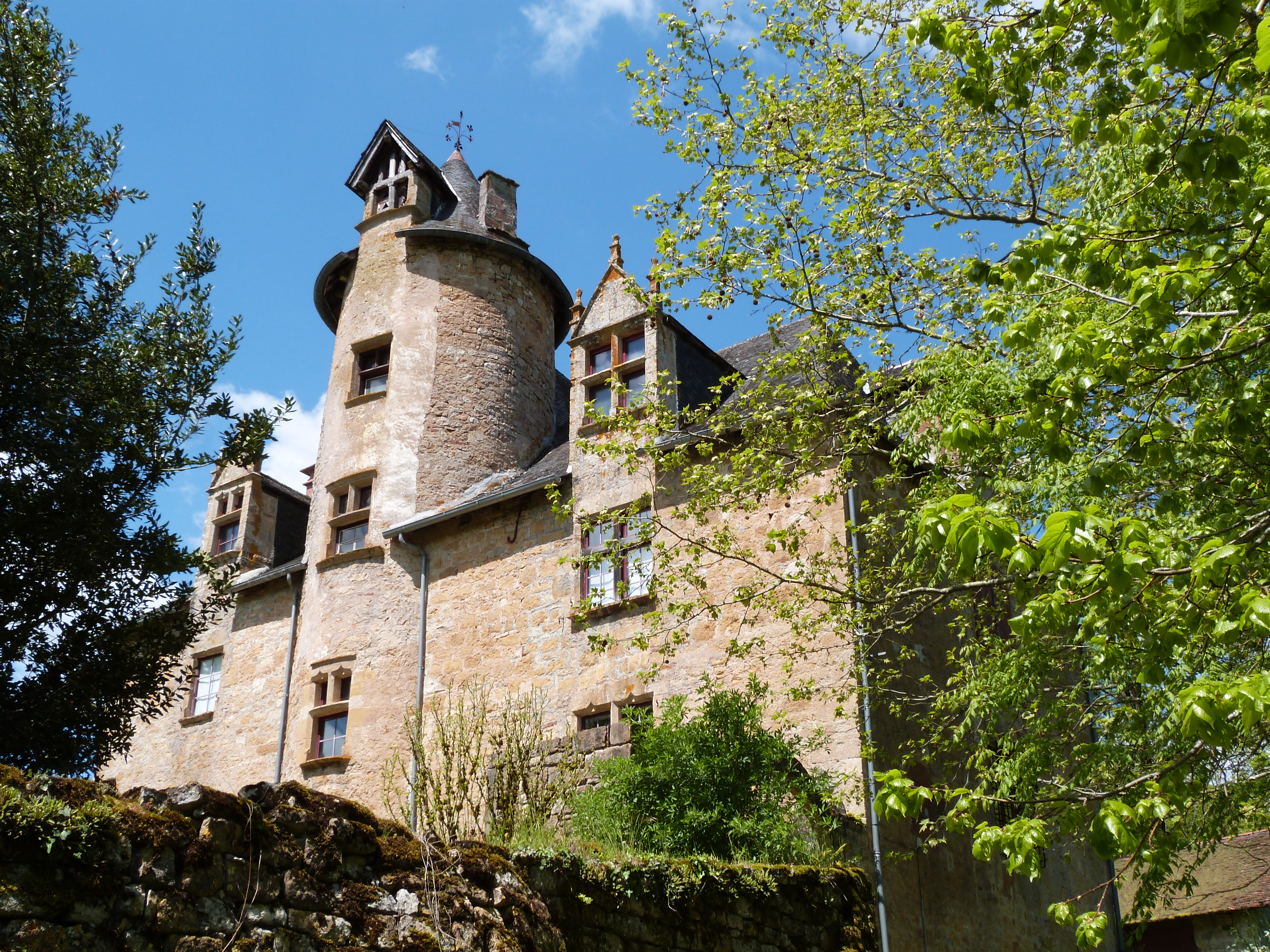
Château de Peuch

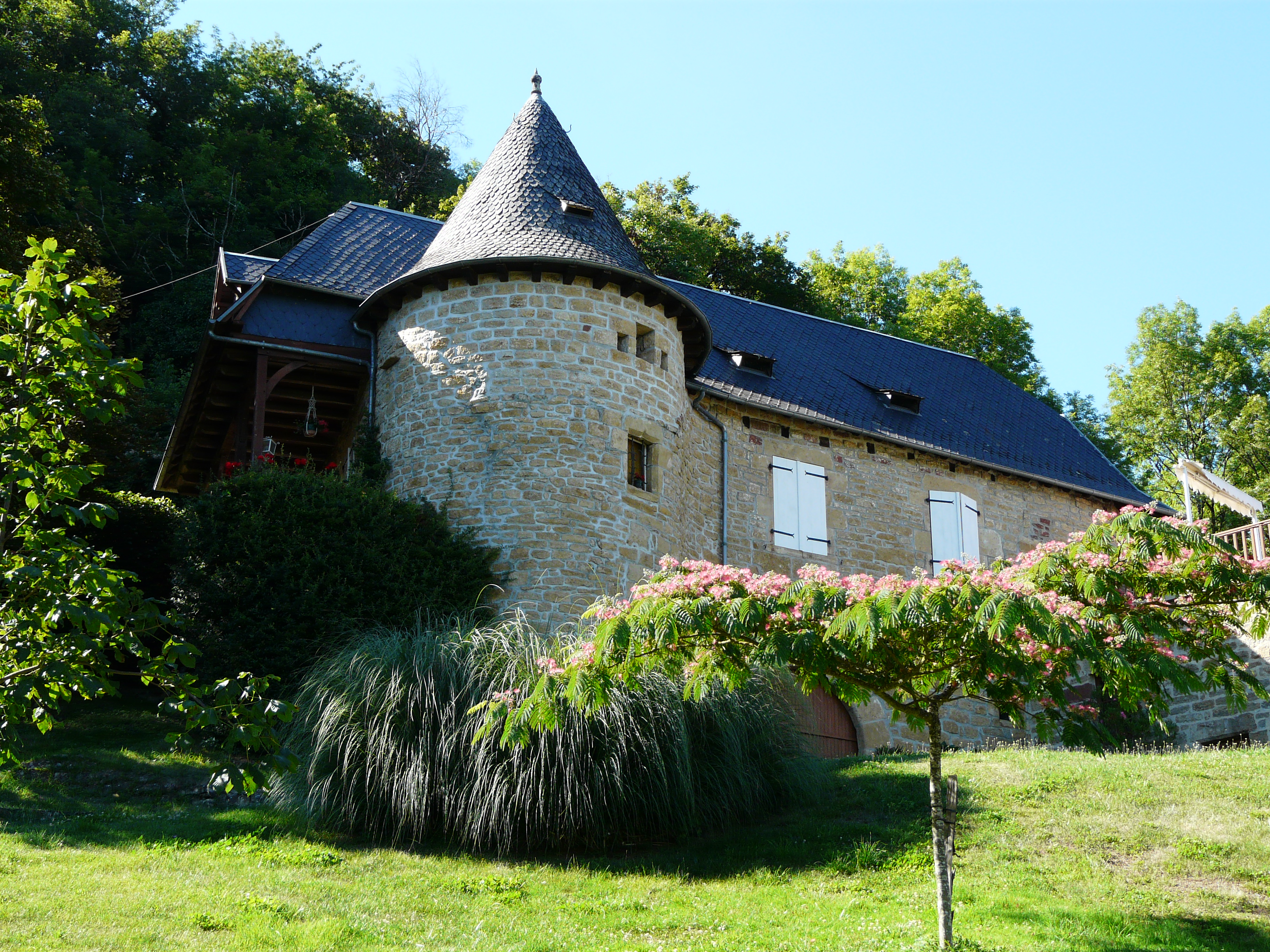
House in the village of Ligneyrac.

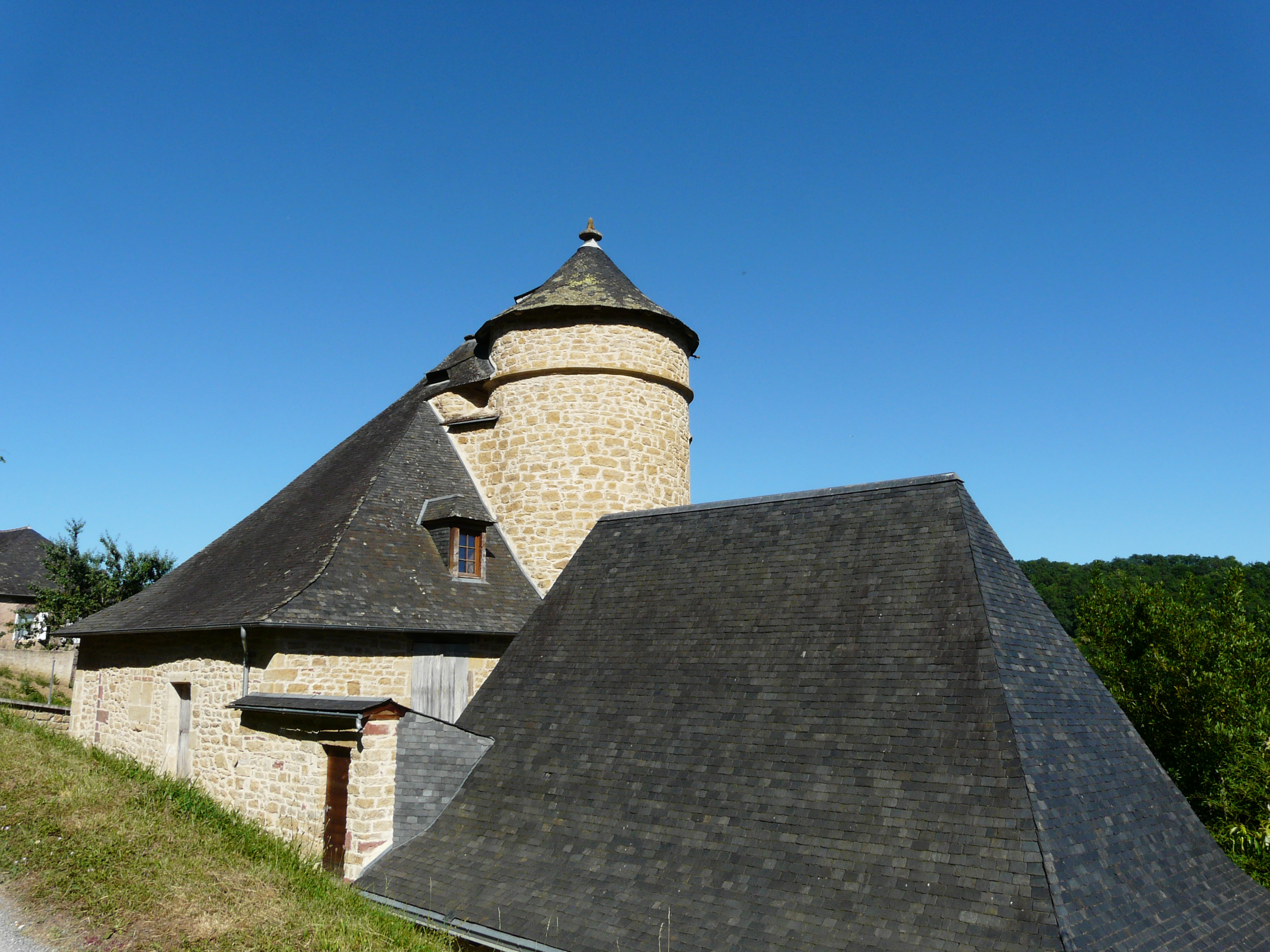
House in the village of Ligneyrac.

== Notable people ==
- Adhémar Robert – a cardinal of the 14th century, born at the Château des Roberts;
- Raymond Datheil (1902–1983) – poet, was a young teacher there.

== See also ==
- Communes of the Corrèze department
