= Lagleygeolle =

- Commune
- Coat of arms
- Location of Lagleygeolle
- Location within France Location within Nouvelle-Aquitaine
- Coordinates: 45°04′44″N 1°41′47″E
- Country: France
- Region: Nouvelle-Aquitaine
- Department: Corrèze
- Arrondissement: Brive-la-Gaillarde
- Canton: Midi Corrézien
- Intercommunality: Midi Corrézien

Government
  - Mayor (2020–2026): Laurent Bressy
- Area^{1}: 19.54 km^{2} (7.54 sq mi)
- Elevation: 450 m (1,480 ft)
- Highest elevation: 468 m (1,535 ft)
- Lowest elevation: 192 m (630 ft)
- Population (2023): 225
  - Density: 11.5/km^{2} (29.8/sq mi)
- Time zone: UTC+01:00 (CET)
  - Summer (DST): UTC+02:00 (CEST)
- INSEE/Postal code: 19099 /19500
- ^{1} French Land Register data, which excludes lakes, ponds, glaciers > 1 km^{2} (0.386 sq mi or 247 acres) and river estuaries.

Lagleygeolle (French pronunciation: [laɡleʒɔl]; Occitan: La Gleisòla) is a commune in the Corrèze department of central France.

== Toponymy ==
In Occitan, the commune name pronounced Gleygeollo means small church.

== History ==
In medieval times, the village and lands were the dependency of the Viscounts of Turenne. In 1100s, close to the present church there existed a priory.

== Geography ==
Situated on summit of 447m, the commune is located near the Massif Central. The Maumont river, a tributary of the Sourdoire, has its source there.

=== Neighbouring municipalities ===
The neighbouring communes are Beynat, Collonges-la-Rouge, Lanteuil, Meyssac, Noailhac, Le Pescher, Saint-Bazile-de-Meyssac and Sérilhac.

== Population ==
Historical population
Year	Pop.	±% p.a.
1968	323	—
1975	300	−1.05%
1982	255	−2.29%
1990	257	+0.10%
1999	234	−1.04%
2007	236	+0.11%
2012	215	−1.85%
2017	220	+0.46%
2023	225	+0.38%
Source: INSEE

== See also ==
- Communes of the Corrèze department
