= Végennes =

- Commune
- Coat of arms
- Location of Végennes
- Location within France Location within Nouvelle-Aquitaine
- Coordinates: 44°58′59″N 1°44′26″E
- Country: France
- Region: Nouvelle-Aquitaine
- Department: Corrèze
- Arrondissement: Brive-la-Gaillarde
- Canton: Midi Corrézien
- Intercommunality: Midi Corrézien

Government
  - Mayor (2026–32): Roselyne Poujade
- Area^{1}: 10.11 km^{2} (3.90 sq mi)
- Elevation: 270 m (890 ft)
- Highest elevation: 360 m (1,180 ft)
- Lowest elevation: 125 m (410 ft)
- Population (2023): 171
  - Density: 16.9/km^{2} (43.8/sq mi)
- Time zone: UTC+01:00 (CET)
  - Summer (DST): UTC+02:00 (CEST)
- INSEE/Postal code: 19280 /19120
- ^{1} French Land Register data, which excludes lakes, ponds, glaciers > 1 km^{2} (0.386 sq mi or 247 acres) and river estuaries.

Végennes (French pronunciation: [veʒɛn]; Occitan: Vegena) is a commune in the Corrèze department in central France in the Nouvelle-Aquitaine region.

== Geography ==
=== Location ===
The commune is located in the south of the Corrèze department. The village borders the department of the Lot and the Occitanie region.

=== Population ===
Historical population
Year	Pop.	±% p.a.
1968	242	—
1975	208	−2.14%
1982	200	−0.56%
1990	181	−1.24%
1999	182	+0.06%
2007	167	−1.07%
2012	163	−0.48%
2017	181	+2.12%
2023	171	−0.94%
Source: INSEE

== History ==
In 856 at Veterinas, as Végennes was called, Rodolphe de Turenne, Archbishop of Bourges established a Benedictine settlement there. It would fail and he moved the settlement to Vellinus which he renamed Bellus Locus that eventually became Beaulieu-sur-Dordogne.

== Notable persons ==
- Jacques Ricard de Genouillac, dit Galiot de Genouillac - military and French diplomat during the Renaissance, died at Végennes on 15 October 1546

== See also ==
- Communes of the Corrèze department
