= Marcillac-la-Croze =

- Commune
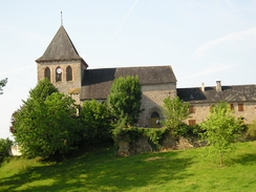
- The church in Marcillac-la-Croze

- Coat of arms
- Location of Marcillac-la-Croze
- Location within France Location within Nouvelle-Aquitaine
- Coordinates: 45°02′06″N 1°44′35″E
- Country: France
- Region: Nouvelle-Aquitaine
- Department: Corrèze
- Arrondissement: Brive-la-Gaillarde
- Canton: Midi Corrézien

Government
  - Mayor (2020–2026): Jean Bouyssou
- Area^{1}: 6.11 km^{2} (2.36 sq mi)
- Population (2023): 190
  - Density: 31/km^{2} (81/sq mi)
- Time zone: UTC+01:00 (CET)
  - Summer (DST): UTC+02:00 (CEST)
- INSEE/Postal code: 19126 /19500
- ^{1} French Land Register data, which excludes lakes, ponds, glaciers > 1 km^{2} (0.386 sq mi or 247 acres) and river estuaries.

Marcillac-la-Croze (French pronunciation: [maʁsijak la kʁɔz]; Occitan: Marcilhac la Cròsa) is a commune in the Corrèze department in central France.

== Population ==
Historical population
Year	Pop.	±% p.a.
1968	281	—
1975	242	−2.11%
1982	232	−0.60%
1990	226	−0.33%
1999	212	−0.71%
2007	195	−1.04%
2012	180	−1.59%
2017	178	−0.22%
2023	190	+1.09%
Source: INSEE

== See also ==
- Communes of the Corrèze department
