= Sérilhac =

- Commune
- Coat of arms
- Location of Sérilhac
- Location within France Location within Nouvelle-Aquitaine
- Coordinates: 45°05′20″N 1°43′37″E
- Country: France
- Region: Nouvelle-Aquitaine
- Department: Corrèze
- Arrondissement: Brive-la-Gaillarde
- Canton: Midi Corrézien

Government
  - Mayor (2026–32): Nathalie Laborde
- Area^{1}: 12.32 km^{2} (4.76 sq mi)
- Highest elevation: 552 m (1,811 ft)
- Lowest elevation: 194 m (636 ft)
- Population (2023): 275
  - Density: 22.3/km^{2} (57.8/sq mi)
- Time zone: UTC+01:00 (CET)
  - Summer (DST): UTC+02:00 (CEST)
- INSEE/Postal code: 19257 /19190
- ^{1} French Land Register data, which excludes lakes, ponds, glaciers > 1 km^{2} (0.386 sq mi or 247 acres) and river estuaries.

Sérilhac (French pronunciation: [seʁijak]; Occitan: Serelhac) is a commune in the Corrèze department in central France.

== Population ==
Historical population
Year	Pop.	±% p.a.
1968	365	—
1975	352	−0.52%
1982	313	−1.66%
1990	308	−0.20%
1999	313	+0.18%
2007	291	−0.91%
2012	276	−1.05%
2017	268	−0.59%
2023	275	+0.43%
Source: INSEE

== See also ==
- Communes of the Corrèze department
