= Le Pescher =

- Commune
- Coat of arms
- Location of Le Pescher
- Location within France Location within Nouvelle-Aquitaine
- Coordinates: 45°04′17″N 1°44′26″E
- Country: France
- Region: Nouvelle-Aquitaine
- Department: Corrèze
- Arrondissement: Brive-la-Gaillarde
- Canton: Midi Corrézien
- Intercommunality: Midi Corrézien

Government
  - Mayor (2020–2026): Éric Galinon
- Area^{1}: 11.32 km^{2} (4.37 sq mi)
- Population (2023): 365
  - Density: 32.2/km^{2} (83.5/sq mi)
- Time zone: UTC+01:00 (CET)
  - Summer (DST): UTC+02:00 (CEST)
- INSEE/Postal code: 19163 /19190
- ^{1} French Land Register data, which excludes lakes, ponds, glaciers > 1 km^{2} (0.386 sq mi or 247 acres) and river estuaries.

Le Pescher (French pronunciation: [lə pɛʃe]; Occitan: Lo Peschier) is a commune in the Corrèze department in central France.

== Population ==
Historical population
Year	Pop.	±% p.a.
1968	349	—
1975	297	−2.28%
1982	265	−1.62%
1990	249	−0.78%
1999	267	+0.78%
2007	274	+0.32%
2012	274	+0.00%
2017	288	+1.00%
2023	365	+4.03%
Source: INSEE

== See also ==
- Communes of the Corrèze department
