= Noailhac, Corrèze =

Noailhac
- Commune
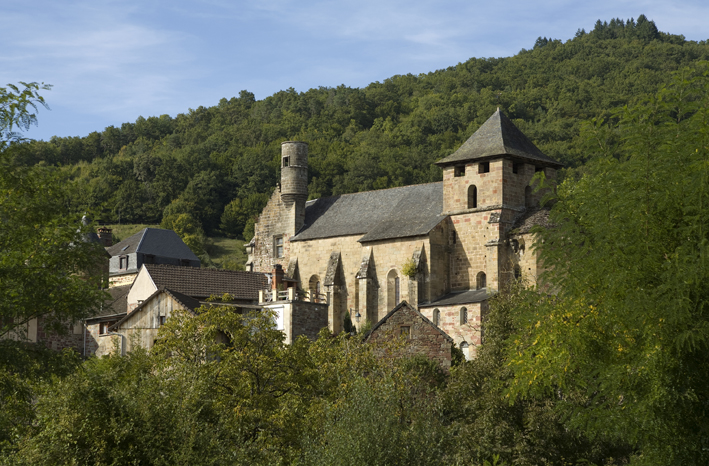
- The church of Saint-Pierre-ès-Liens, in Noailhac

- Coat of arms
- Location of Noailhac
- Location within France Location within Nouvelle-Aquitaine
- Coordinates: 45°04′26″N 1°37′09″E
- Country: France
- Region: Nouvelle-Aquitaine
- Department: Corrèze
- Arrondissement: Brive-la-Gaillarde
- Canton: Midi Corrézien
- Intercommunality: Midi Corrézien

Government
  - Mayor (2026–32): Evelyne Strauss
- Area^{1}: 13.51 km^{2} (5.22 sq mi)
- Elevation: 220 m (720 ft)
- Highest elevation: 502 m (1,647 ft)
- Lowest elevation: 161 m (528 ft)
- Population (2023): 348
  - Density: 25.8/km^{2} (66.7/sq mi)
- Time zone: UTC+01:00 (CET)
  - Summer (DST): UTC+02:00 (CEST)
- INSEE/Postal code: 19150 /19500
- ^{1} French Land Register data, which excludes lakes, ponds, glaciers > 1 km^{2} (0.386 sq mi or 247 acres) and river estuaries.

Noailhac (French pronunciation: [nɔajak]; Occitan: Noalhac) is a commune in the Corrèze department in central France.

== Population ==
Historical population
Year	Pop.	±% p.a.
1968	276	—
1975	242	−1.86%
1982	266	+1.36%
1990	276	+0.46%
1999	310	+1.30%
2007	329	+0.75%
2012	373	+2.54%
2017	378	+0.27%
2023	348	−1.37%
Source: INSEE

== See also ==
- Communes of the Corrèze department
