= Palazinges =

- Commune
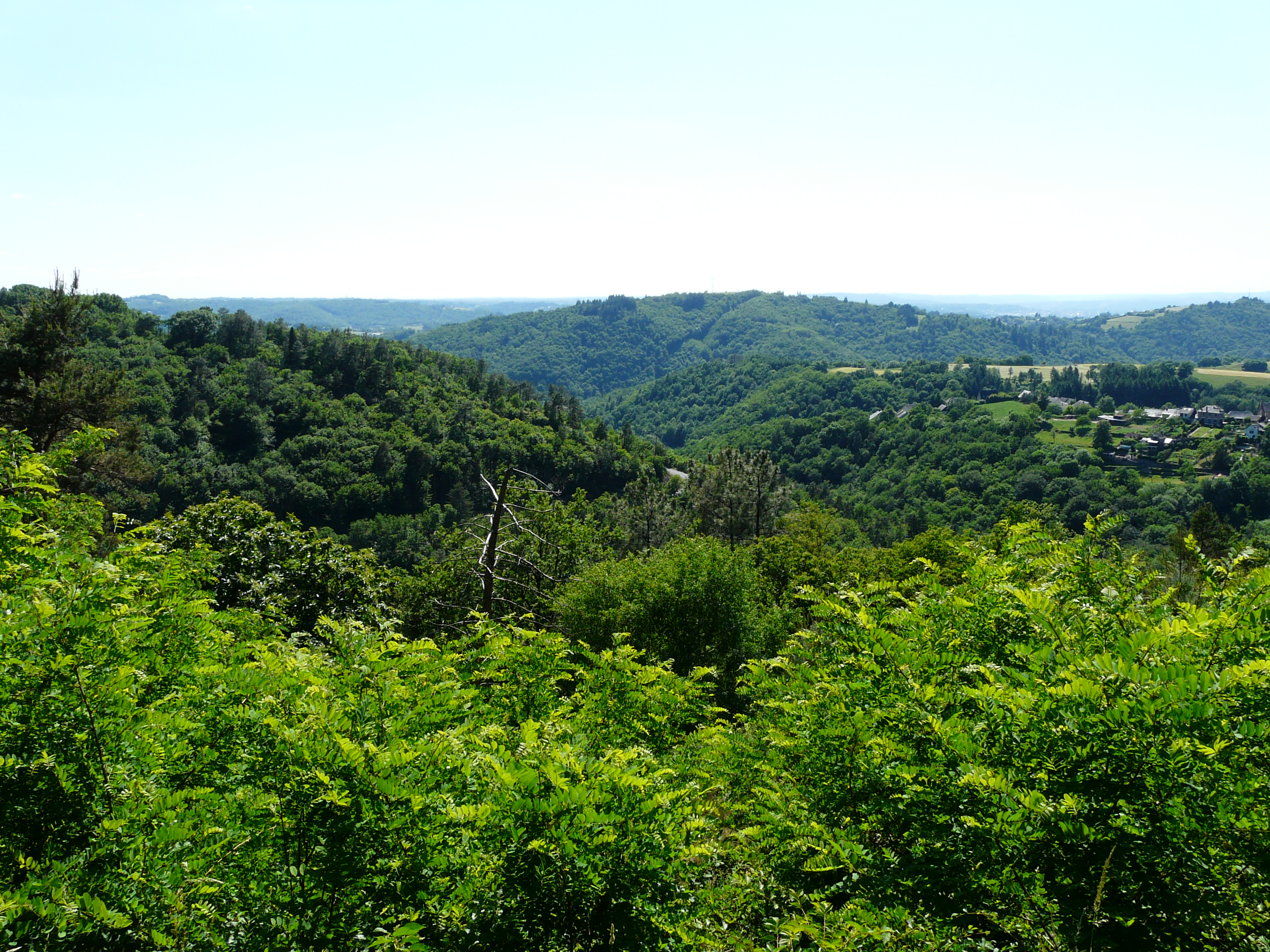
- The Coiroux gorge

- Coat of arms
- Location of Palazinges
- Location within France Location within Nouvelle-Aquitaine
- Coordinates: 45°09′36″N 1°41′45″E
- Country: France
- Region: Nouvelle-Aquitaine
- Department: Corrèze
- Arrondissement: Brive-la-Gaillarde
- Canton: Midi Corrézien
- Intercommunality: Midi Corrézien

Government
  - Mayor (2020–2026): Yves Pouchou
- Area^{1}: 5.25 km^{2} (2.03 sq mi)
- Elevation: 560 m (1,840 ft)
- Highest elevation: 551 m (1,808 ft)
- Lowest elevation: 306 m (1,004 ft)
- Population (2023): 162
  - Density: 30.9/km^{2} (79.9/sq mi)
- Time zone: UTC+01:00 (CET)
  - Summer (DST): UTC+02:00 (CEST)
- INSEE/Postal code: 19156 /19190
- ^{1} French Land Register data, which excludes lakes, ponds, glaciers > 1 km^{2} (0.386 sq mi or 247 acres) and river estuaries.

Palazinges (French pronunciation: [palazɛ̃ʒ]; Occitan: Palajanjas) is a commune in the Corrèze department in central France.

== Population ==
Historical population
| Year | Pop. | ±% p.a. |
|---|---|---|
| 1968 | 95 | — |
| 1975 | 99 | +0.59% |
| 1982 | 100 | +0.14% |
| 1990 | 115 | +1.76% |
| 1999 | 103 | −1.22% |
| 2007 | 111 | +0.94% |
| 2012 | 122 | +1.91% |
| 2017 | 153 | +4.63% |
| 2023 | 162 | +0.96% |
Source: INSEE

== See also ==
- Communes of the Corrèze department
