= Bilhac =

- Commune
- Coat of arms
- Location of Bilhac
- Location within France Location within Nouvelle-Aquitaine
- Coordinates: 44°56′40″N 1°46′29″E
- Country: France
- Region: Nouvelle-Aquitaine
- Department: Corrèze
- Arrondissement: Brive-la-Gaillarde
- Canton: Midi Corrézien

Government
  - Mayor (2020–2026): Jean-Paul Dumas
- Area^{1}: 6.99 km^{2} (2.70 sq mi)
- Elevation: 250 m (820 ft)
- Highest elevation: 285 m (935 ft)
- Lowest elevation: 125 m (410 ft)
- Population (2023): 242
  - Density: 34.6/km^{2} (89.7/sq mi)
- Time zone: UTC+01:00 (CET)
  - Summer (DST): UTC+02:00 (CEST)
- INSEE/Postal code: 19026 /19120
- ^{1} French Land Register data, which excludes lakes, ponds, glaciers > 1 km^{2} (0.386 sq mi or 247 acres) and river estuaries.

Bilhac (French pronunciation: [bijak]; formerly Billac) is a commune in the Corrèze department in central France.

== Toponymy ==
Until recently the commune had been named Billac, a decree of the Ministry of the Interior on 10 August 2007, published in the official journal on 14 August 2007, the commune was renamed Bilhac.

== Population ==
Historical population
Year	Pop.	±% p.a.
1968	234	—
1975	205	−1.87%
1982	211	+0.41%
1990	211	+0.00%
1999	192	−1.04%
2007	218	+1.60%
2012	193	−2.41%
2017	246	+4.97%
2023	242	−0.27%
Source: INSEE

== Local culture and heritage ==
=== Places and monuments ===
- Église Saint-Martin - dating from the twelfth century and then remodelled. The apse has been listed as a historical monument since 12 February 1925. The church is a former chapel of the chateau, romanesque in style, the bell tower from 1100s, while the portal dates from 1200s; The nave has been remodelled and a slate framework spire dates from the 1700s.
- Le Chateau de Bilhac - close to the church, heavily modified in the 1600s and 1800s, has a circular tower.

== See also ==
- Communes of the Corrèze department
