= Canton of Midi Corrézien =

Coordinates: 45.12°N 1.72°E

The canton of Midi Corrézien is an administrative division of the Corrèze department, south-central France. It was created at the French canton reorganisation which came into effect in March 2015. Its seat is in Beynat. It consists of a collection of communes.

== History ==
A new territorial division of Corrèze entered into law in March 2015, defined by a decree of 24 February 2014, pursuant to the laws of 17 May 2013 (Organic Law 2013-402 and Law 2013-403). As of these elections, departmental councillors are elected by mixed binomial majority voting. The voters of each canton elect to the Correze Departmental Council, the new name of the General Council, two members of different sexes, who stand as a pair of candidates.

Departmental councillors are elected for 6 years by the majority vote in two rounds, entry to the second round requiring 12.5% of those registered in the 1st round. In addition, all departmental councillors are renewed. In Corrèze, the number of cantons decreased from 37 to 19. The new canton of Midi Corrézien was made up of communes from the former cantons of Beaulieu-sur-Dordogne, Beynat, Meyssac and Argentat on 1 January 2017 merging 34 municipalities of 13,576 inhabitants.

== Composition ==
It consists of the following communes:

1. Albignac
2. Altillac
3. Astaillac
4. Aubazines
5. Beaulieu-sur-Dordogne
6. Beynat
7. Bilhac
8. Branceilles
9. La Chapelle-aux-Saints
10. Chauffour-sur-Vell
11. Chenailler-Mascheix
12. Collonges-la-Rouge
13. Curemonte
14. Lagleygeolle
15. Lanteuil
16. Ligneyrac
17. Liourdres
18. Lostanges
19. Marcillac-la-Croze
20. Ménoire
21. Meyssac
22. Noailhac
23. Nonards
24. Palazinges
25. Le Pescher
26. Puy-d'Arnac
27. Queyssac-les-Vignes
28. Saillac
29. Saint-Bazile-de-Meyssac
30. Saint-Julien-Maumont
31. Sérilhac
32. Sioniac
33. Tudeils
34. Végennes

== Governance ==
The commune is manage by a community council consisting of 51 councillors representing their communes with each commune represent by at least one to five councillors depending on size of its population. Those 28 communes with one representative have a substitute councillor.

The canton has a President and seven vice-presidents who manage the areas of finance, economic development and tourism, cultural and sports policy, town planning and environment, roads, social policy, and children & youth.
