= Meyssac =

- Commune
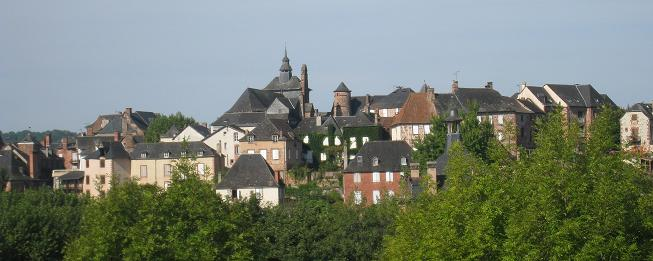
- A general view of Meyssac

- Coat of arms
- Location of Meyssac
- Location within France Location within Nouvelle-Aquitaine
- Coordinates: 45°03′22″N 1°40′36″E
- Country: France
- Region: Nouvelle-Aquitaine
- Department: Corrèze
- Arrondissement: Brive-la-Gaillarde
- Canton: Midi Corrézien

Government
  - Mayor (2020–2026): Christophe Caron
- Area^{1}: 11.59 km^{2} (4.47 sq mi)
- Population (2023): 1,310
  - Density: 113/km^{2} (293/sq mi)
- Time zone: UTC+01:00 (CET)
  - Summer (DST): UTC+02:00 (CEST)
- INSEE/Postal code: 19138 /19500
- ^{1} French Land Register data, which excludes lakes, ponds, glaciers > 1 km^{2} (0.386 sq mi or 247 acres) and river estuaries.

Meyssac (French pronunciation: [mɛsak]; Occitan: Maiçac) is a commune in the Corrèze department in central France. Its inhabitants are called the Meyssacois(es).

== Toponymy ==
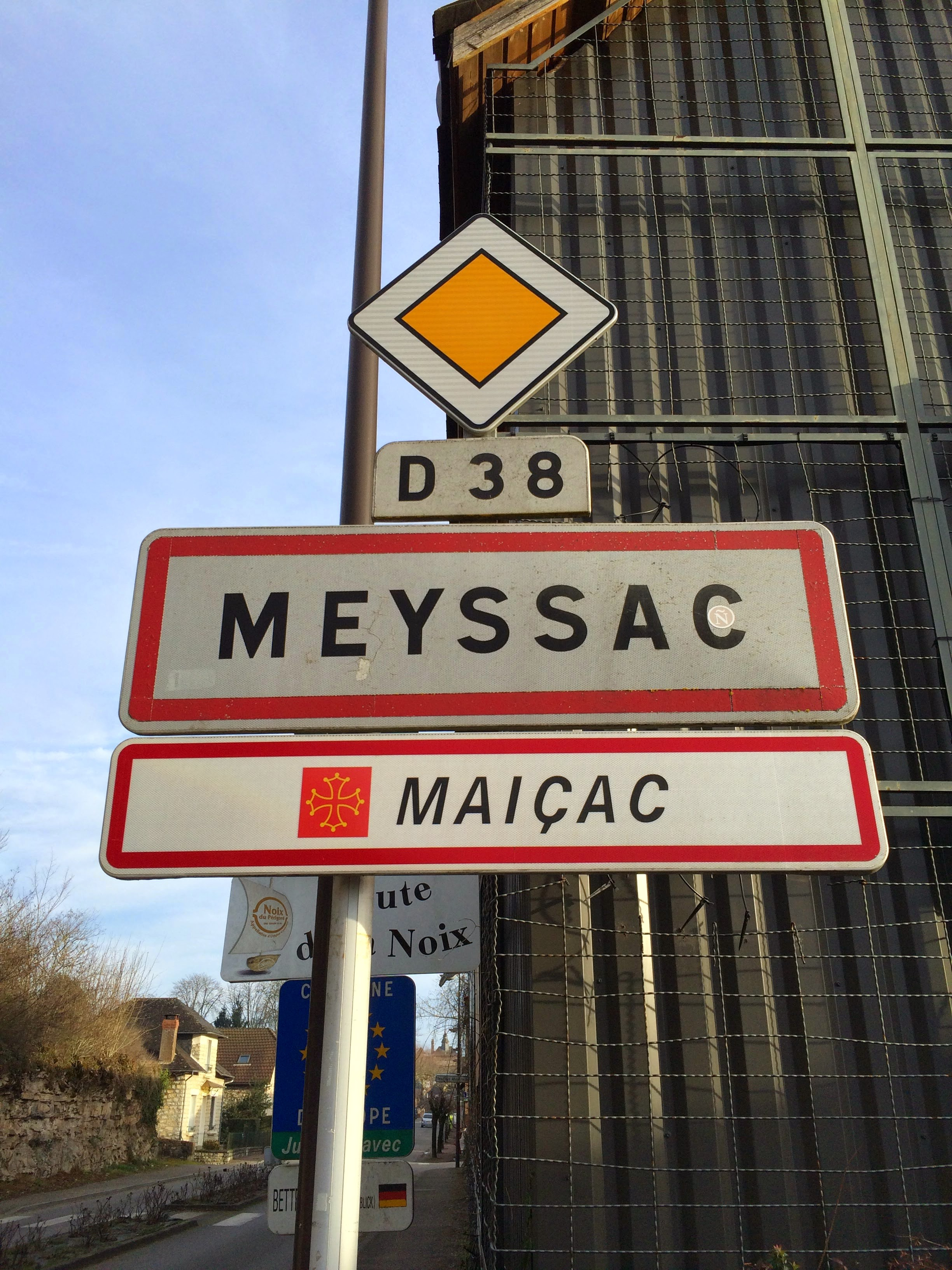
French-Occitan entrance sign of the town of Meyssac

The name Meyssac comes probably from the name of a Gallo-Roman landowner. Marcel Villoutreix (Les noms de lieux du Limousin, T. A. L., 2002, p. 46) gives Maniciaco in 941 from the attested name Mancius; and Mensac, Maensac around 1315.

The form Maiçac corresponds to the pronunciation of the place in Occitan Limousin. Like all the communes of the historic canton of which it was the capital city, Meyssac enjoys a double display on its entrance panels.

== History ==
Until 1738, the fortress of Meyssac belonged to the viscounty of Turenne. The Touchebœuf's family had long been the Lords. Fortifications and a ditch were built to protect the inhabitants from looters. Three doors allowed access: to the east, the gate de Voussée (in the direction of Beaulieu-sur-Dordogne); to the south, the Grande gate (in the direction of Martel); and finally the gate l’Auvitrie, located to the north (towards Tulle). In the eighteenth century, the ruins of these walls, having become useless and troublesome, were destroyed. As in many French towns, the wall were replaced by a large boulevard, a kind of ring road. Once you cross this border between the newer suburbs and old centre, you discover beautiful houses surrounding a church whose Romanesque steeple-porch opens onto a Gothic interior.

== Geography ==
Meyssac is located in the extreme south of the Corrèze, 20 km from Brive-la-Gaillarde. Some of its architectural treasures are gathered around its church, as well as along its alleys lined with beautiful houses of red sandstone, with the sometimes lively facades of climbing vines. The red earth, called Terre de Collonges, lends itself to pottery work.

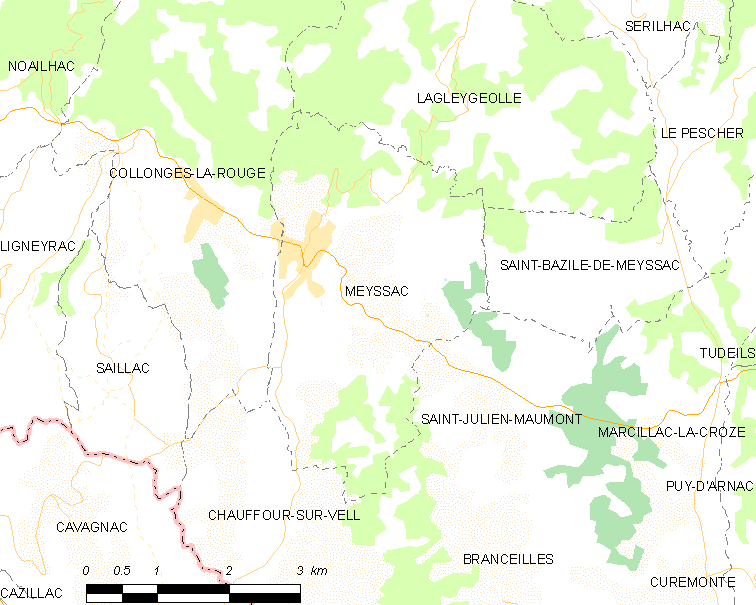
Map of the commune.

=== Population ===
Historical population
Year	Pop.	±% p.a.
1968	1,046	—
1975	1,073	+0.36%
1982	1,103	+0.39%
1990	1,124	+0.24%
1999	1,100	−0.24%
2007	1,222	+1.32%
2012	1,272	+0.81%
2017	1,275	+0.05%
2023	1,310	+0.45%
Source: INSEE

== Economy ==
The canton retains its agricultural purpose. Most farms are of medium size (between 10 and 35 ha). The main production is of the beef Limousin cattle, and especially milk-fed-veal - a regional speciality. The wine, Mille et Une Pierres is also produced in the territory of Branceilles, the Marbot de Saillac nut, foie gras and jams, little chestnuts, goats cheese, etc.

In other economic activity, tourists follow the footsteps of the pilgrims who from the tenth century, travelled to Santiago de Compostela and to Rocamadour. Turenne's rich and powerful Viscounty has made manors, castles and other noble houses flourish.

== Places and monuments ==
=== Le Château de Marsac ===
- Gite d'Hôtes 5 Epis

=== The Fairs of Meyssac, a millennial tradition ===
- The origin of these fairs' dates to the Middle Ages. At the time they were the economic wealth of the city. There were country wine, hemp, flax, cereals, and walnut oil. For a long time, the surrounding hills were covered with vineyards. Affected by phylloxera between 1880 and 1883, they disappeared completely and left room for truffles, very prosperous in the 1920s. As this godsend gradually dried up, they turned to breeding. Nowadays, Meyssac fairs specialised in the sale milk fed calf. The name "Meyssac calf" has been issued to them. Three award-winning annual fairs are dedicated to them. The markets are held every Tuesday and Friday morning.

=== L’église Saint-Vincent et Saint-Roch ===
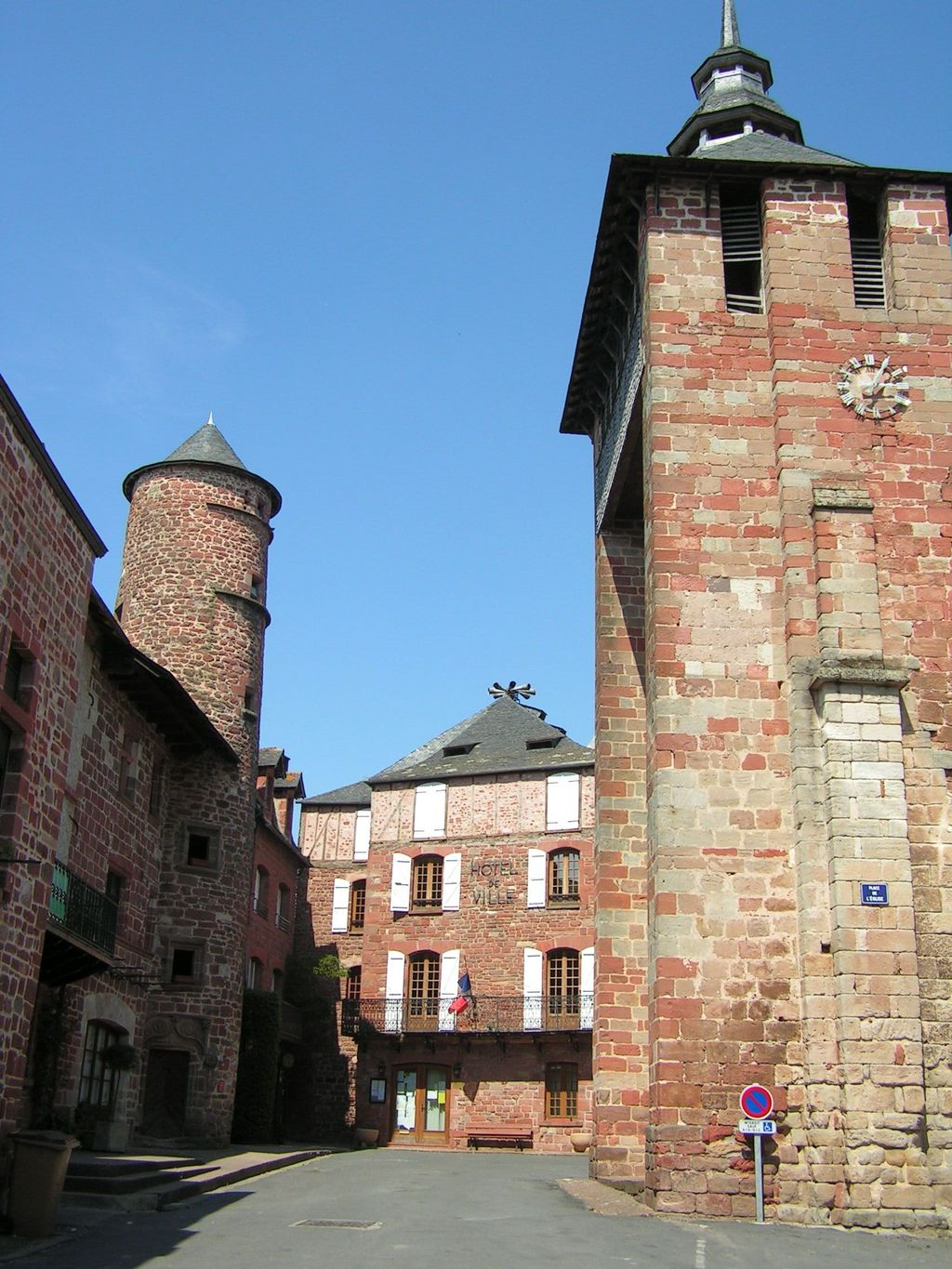
Church

- The Church of Saint-Vincent, dating from the 12th, 15th and 16th centuries, was classified as historical monuments in 1942. Built on a single-nave plane, the church is named after Saint-Roch and Saint-Vincent, the latter, a patron saint of winegrowers, because of the surrounding vineyards, which disappeared at the end of the nineteenth century. With its slightly broken cornices, the west portal is a very good model of a Roman Limousin portal. At the end of the Middle Ages, major works changed the building. The successive attacks of the city during the Hundred Years War prompted the inhabitants to fortify it by endowing it with wood hoards in the manner of a fortified castle. The upper parts were replaced by rib vaults. The Wars of Religion resulted in the reinforcement of existing defences, as indicated by the arrowslits for cannons located in the west or the Bretèche on the south wall. Inside, two statues – a Pietà and a Virgin and Child – recall the importance of the Mother Mary cult in Corrèze.

=== La Vieille hall ===
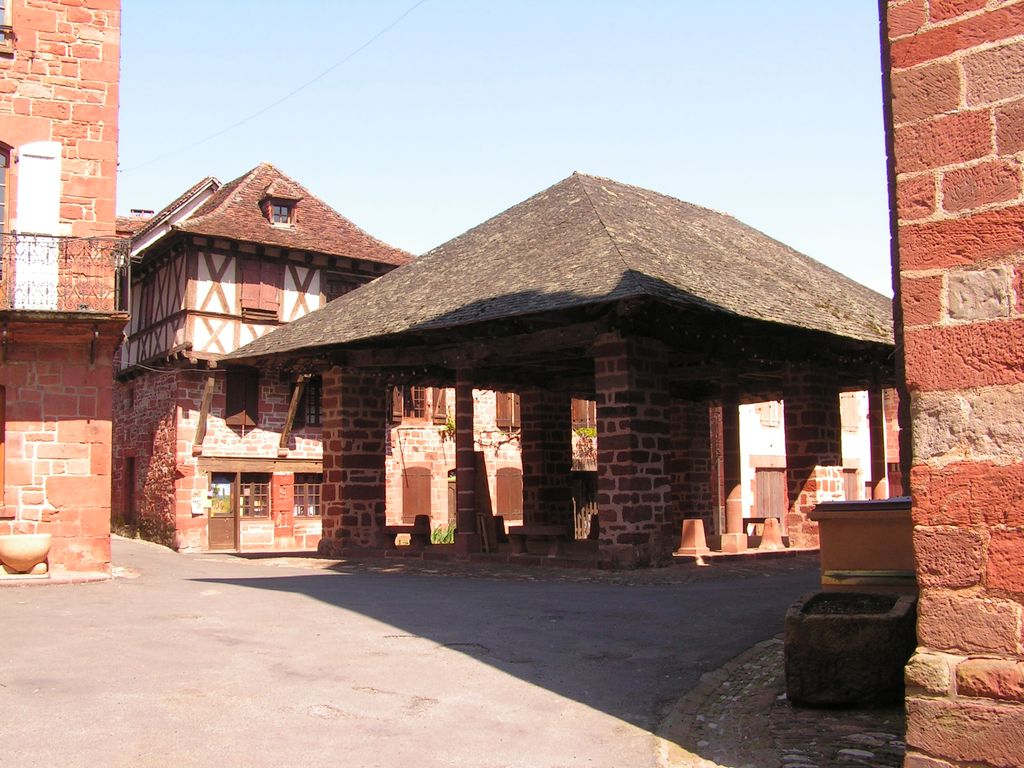
Market hall

- Located behind the church is the 18th-century grain hall, a witness to the commercial activity of Meyssac. Its imposing slate roof covers a chestnut frame that supports pillars and columns of red sandstone. Today it houses various events, and the children's games of the neighbourhood.

=== The Maison Verdès ===
- next to the church

== See also ==
- Communes of the Corrèze department
