= Queyssac-les-Vignes =

- Commune
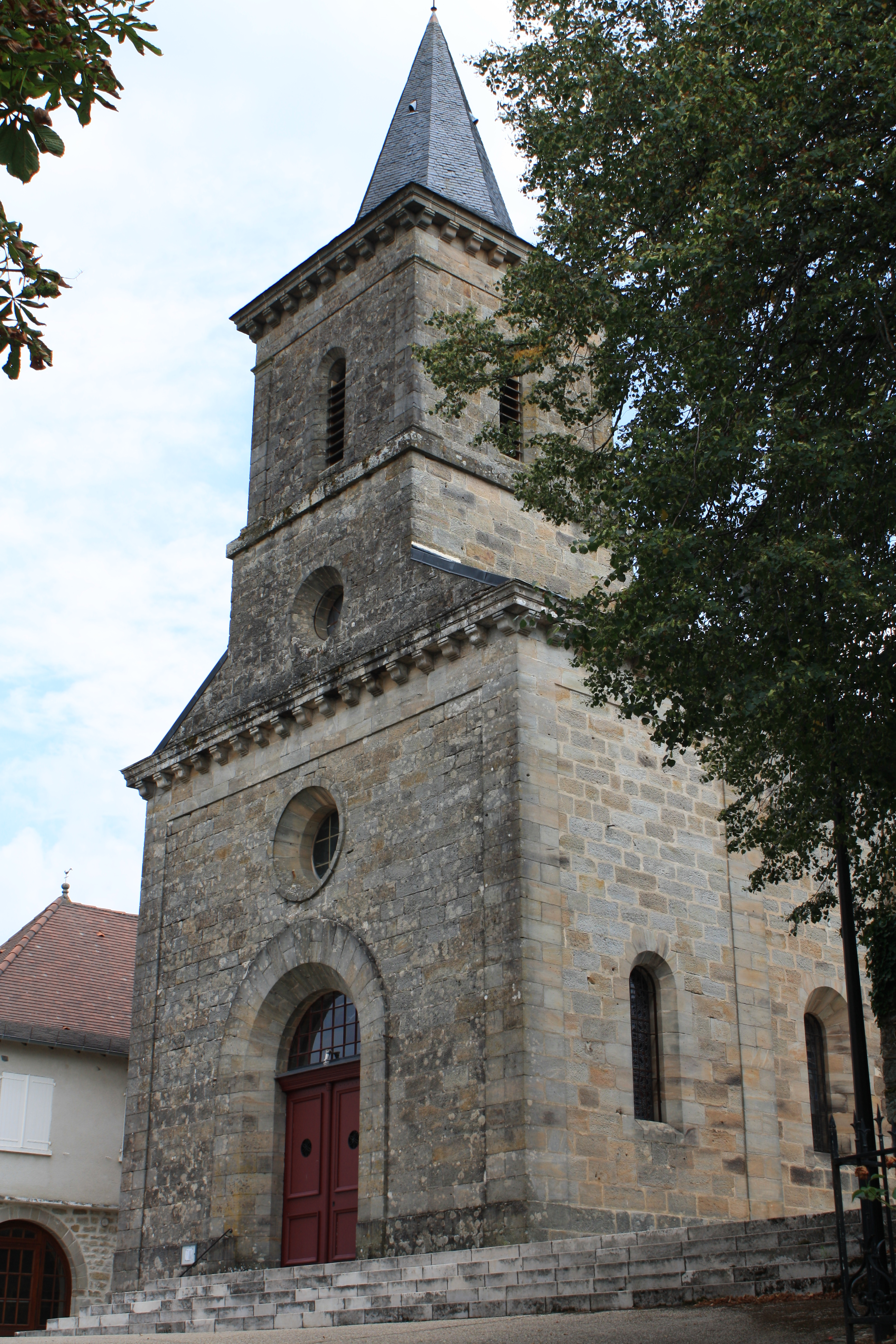
- The church in Queyssac-les-Vignes

- Coat of arms
- Location of Queyssac-les-Vignes
- Location within France Location within Nouvelle-Aquitaine
- Coordinates: 44°58′01″N 1°46′05″E
- Country: France
- Region: Nouvelle-Aquitaine
- Department: Corrèze
- Arrondissement: Brive-la-Gaillarde
- Canton: Midi Corrézien
- Intercommunality: Midi Corrézien

Government
  - Mayor (2020–2026): Jean-Louis Roche
- Area^{1}: 11.13 km^{2} (4.30 sq mi)
- Elevation: 310 m (1,020 ft)
- Highest elevation: 343 m (1,125 ft)
- Lowest elevation: 134 m (440 ft)
- Population (2023): 235
  - Density: 21.1/km^{2} (54.7/sq mi)
- Time zone: UTC+01:00 (CET)
  - Summer (DST): UTC+02:00 (CEST)
- INSEE/Postal code: 19170 /19120
- ^{1} French Land Register data, which excludes lakes, ponds, glaciers > 1 km^{2} (0.386 sq mi or 247 acres) and river estuaries.

Queyssac-les-Vignes (French pronunciation: [kɛsak le viɲ]; Occitan: Caissac las Vinhas) is a commune in the Corrèze department in central France.

== History ==
In the historical past, the village was under control of the Viscounty of Turenne, with a castle which they owned until the 13th century before it passed to the one of their liege lords, the de Corn family. The castle was rebuilt in 1545 in a renaissance style and survived until 1860 when it was demolished. A tower remains.

Its slopes grew grapes for wine up until the 1880s when phylloxera destroyed its main industry but a few vineyards remain growing grape for Vin paillé (straw wine) now classified as the Corrèze (AOC) wine region.

== Population ==
Historical population
Year	Pop.	±% p.a.
1968	253	—
1975	222	−1.85%
1982	213	−0.59%
1990	191	−1.35%
1999	180	−0.66%
2007	191	+0.74%
2012	217	+2.59%
2017	203	−1.32%
2023	235	+2.47%
Source: INSEE

== Local culture and heritage ==
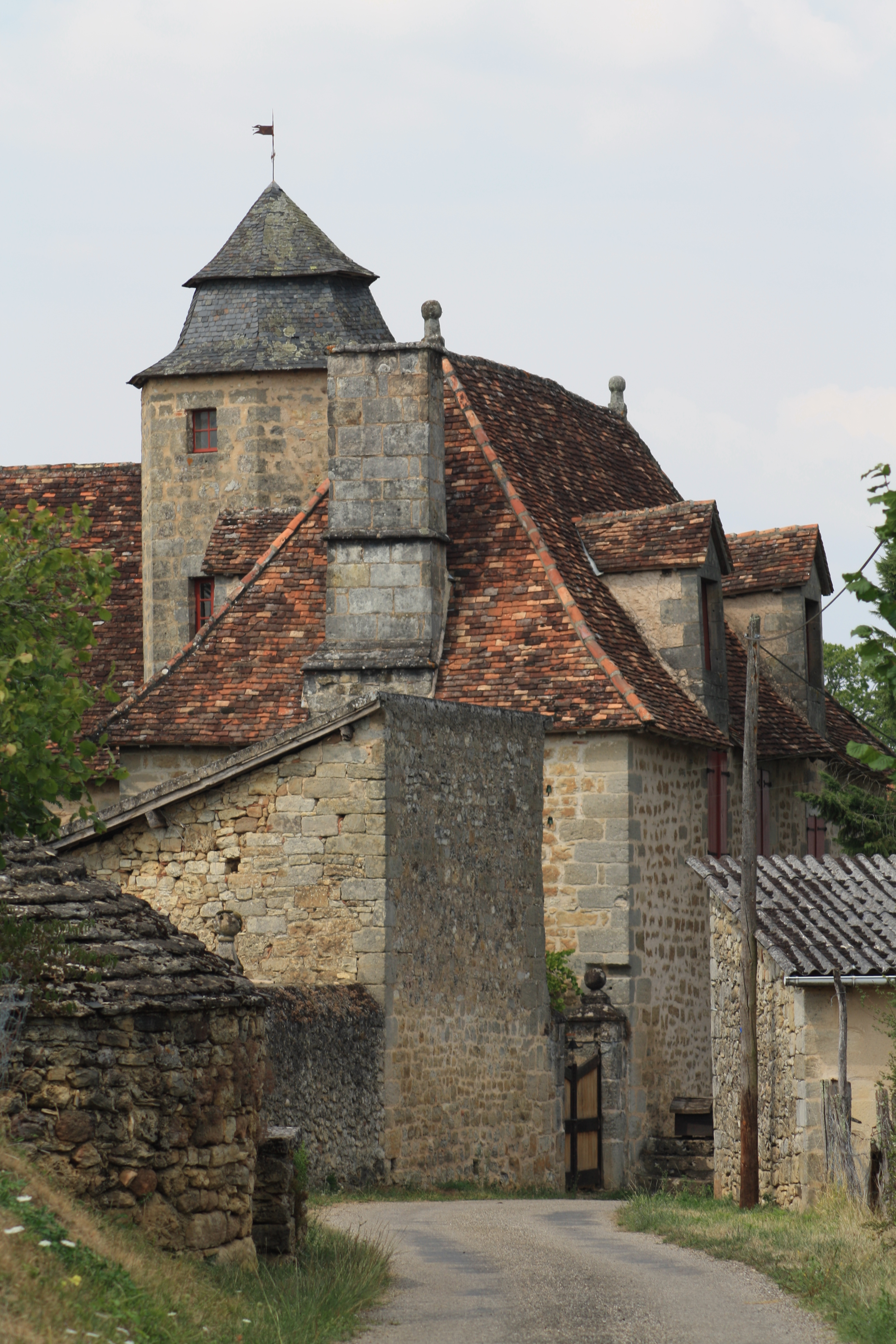
Manoir du Battutt

- Église de l’Assomption-de-Notre-Dame de Queyssac-les-Vignes;
- Manoir du Battutt - a listed monument in 1971, is a privately owned manor house, later converted to a farmhouse, which dates from between the 1500 and 1600s. Has a long main building with two wings that form a inner courtyard with a octagonal stairway tower on one end;
- Les Goudeaux - panoramic view of Quercy and the Lot;
- Queyssac-Bas - below the main village, has a cemetery surrounded by a low stone wall, the Chapelle Saint-Blaise dating from 11th century.

== See also ==
- Communes of the Corrèze department
