= Puy-d'Arnac =

- Commune
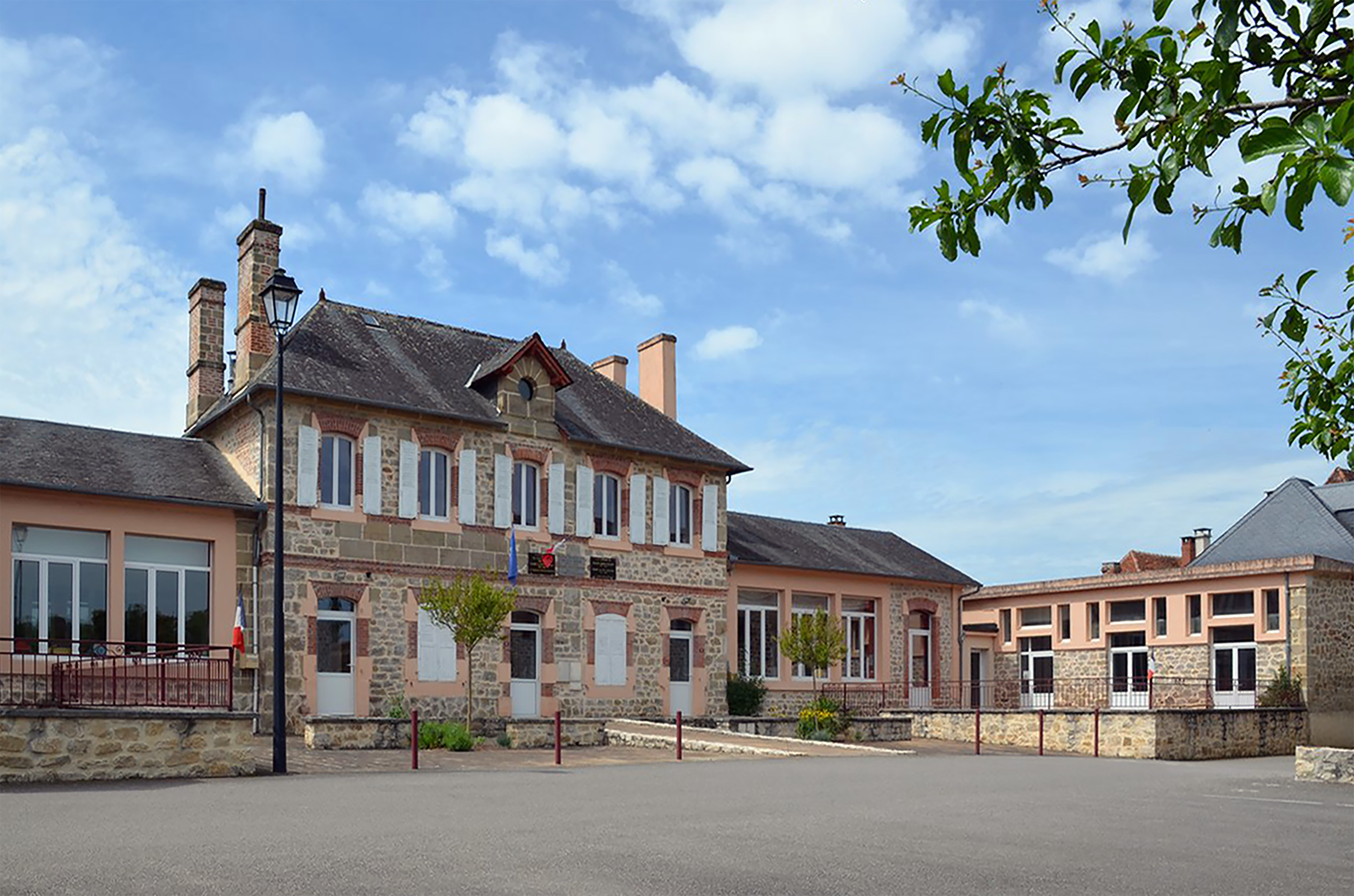
- The town hall of Puy-d'Arnac

- Coat of arms
- Location of Puy-d'Arnac
- Location within France Location within Nouvelle-Aquitaine
- Coordinates: 45°01′42″N 1°47′11″E
- Country: France
- Region: Nouvelle-Aquitaine
- Department: Corrèze
- Arrondissement: Brive-la-Gaillarde
- Canton: Midi Corrézien

Government
  - Mayor (2020–2026): Dominique Perrier
- Area^{1}: 12.27 km^{2} (4.74 sq mi)
- Elevation: 368 m (1,207 ft)
- Highest elevation: 366 m (1,201 ft)
- Lowest elevation: 136 m (446 ft)
- Population (2023): 296
  - Density: 24.1/km^{2} (62.5/sq mi)
- Time zone: UTC+01:00 (CET)
  - Summer (DST): UTC+02:00 (CEST)
- INSEE/Postal code: 19169 /19120
- ^{1} French Land Register data, which excludes lakes, ponds, glaciers > 1 km^{2} (0.386 sq mi or 247 acres) and river estuaries.

Puy-d'Arnac (French pronunciation: [pɥi daʁnak]; Occitan: Puèg d'Arnac) is a commune in the Corrèze department in central France.

== Population ==
Historical population
Year	Pop.	±% p.a.
1968	367	—
1975	325	−1.72%
1982	325	+0.00%
1990	300	−1.00%
1999	236	−2.63%
2007	264	+1.41%
2012	273	+0.67%
2017	288	+1.08%
2023	296	+0.46%
Source: INSEE

== See also ==
- Communes of the Corrèze department
