= Lanteuil =

- Commune
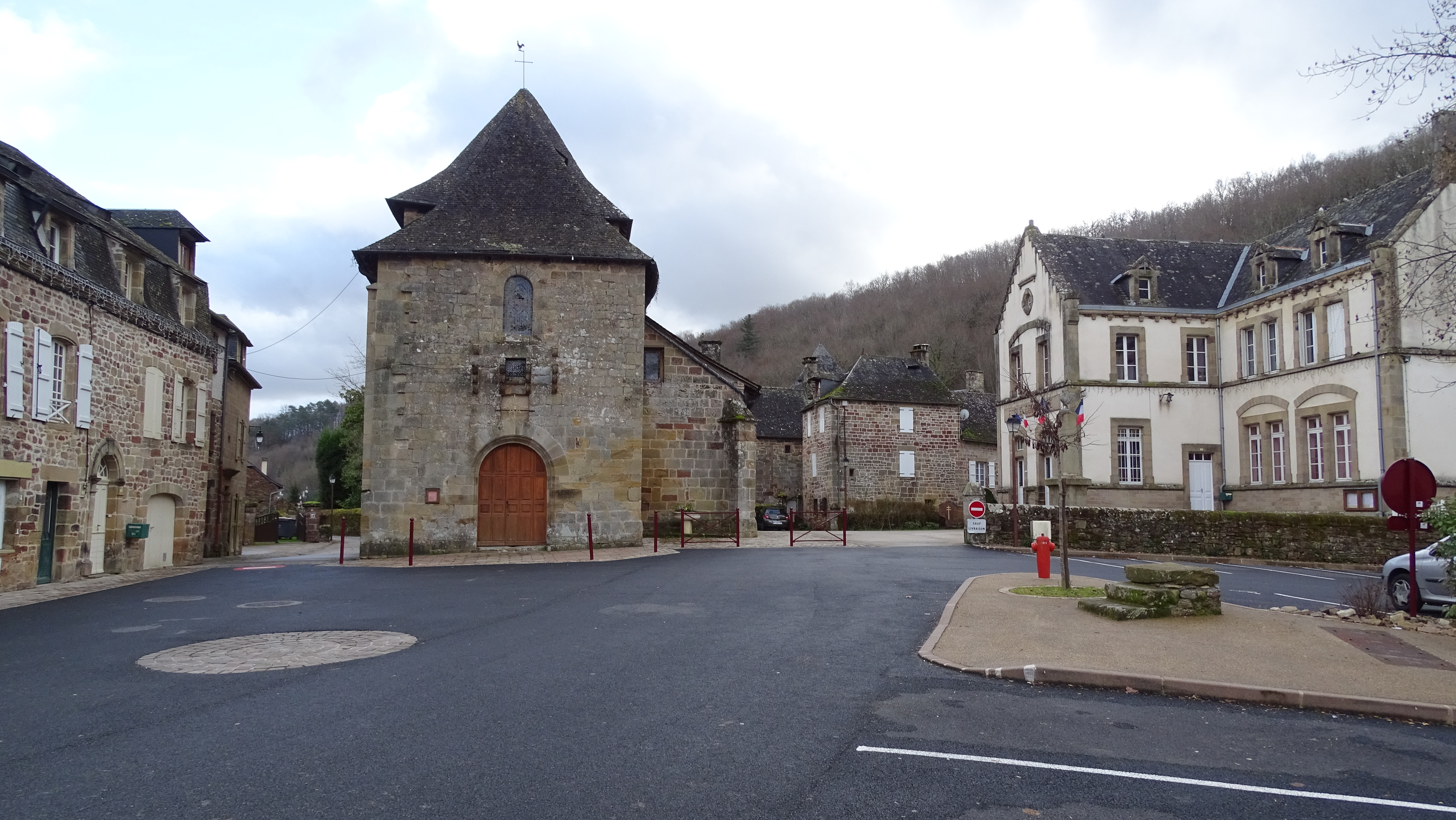
- The church and school, in Lanteuil

- Coat of arms
- Location of Lanteuil
- Location within France Location within Nouvelle-Aquitaine
- Coordinates: 45°07′43″N 1°39′39″E
- Country: France
- Region: Nouvelle-Aquitaine
- Department: Corrèze
- Arrondissement: Brive-la-Gaillarde
- Canton: Midi Corrézien

Government
  - Mayor (2020–2026): Christian Derachinois
- Area^{1}: 22.68 km^{2} (8.76 sq mi)
- Population (2023): 517
  - Density: 22.8/km^{2} (59.0/sq mi)
- Time zone: UTC+01:00 (CET)
  - Summer (DST): UTC+02:00 (CEST)
- INSEE/Postal code: 19105 /19190
- ^{1} French Land Register data, which excludes lakes, ponds, glaciers > 1 km^{2} (0.386 sq mi or 247 acres) and river estuaries.

Lanteuil (French pronunciation: [lɑ̃tœj]; Occitan: Lantòl) is a commune in the Corrèze department in central France.

== Population ==
Historical population
Year	Pop.	±% p.a.
1968	469	—
1975	427	−1.33%
1982	406	−0.72%
1990	431	+0.75%
1999	479	+1.18%
2007	500	+0.54%
2012	538	+1.48%
2017	507	−1.18%
2023	517	+0.33%
Source: INSEE

== See also ==
- Communes of the Corrèze department
