= Saillac, Corrèze =

Saillac
- Commune
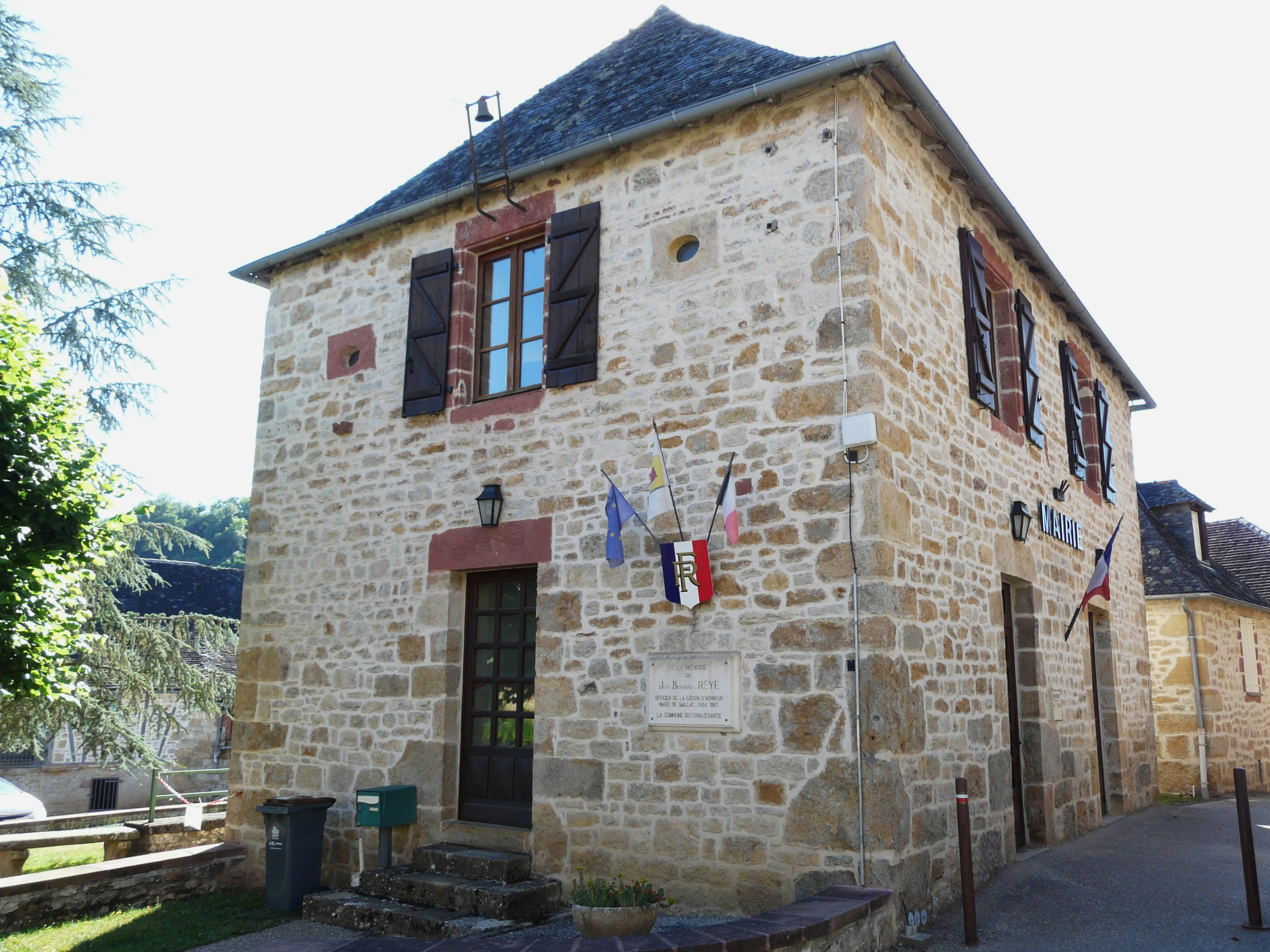
- Town hall

- Coat of arms
- Location of Saillac
- Location within France Location within Nouvelle-Aquitaine
- Coordinates: 45°02′18″N 1°38′29″E
- Country: France
- Region: Nouvelle-Aquitaine
- Department: Corrèze
- Arrondissement: Brive-la-Gaillarde
- Canton: Midi Corrézien

Government
  - Mayor (2026–32): Gilles Tronche
- Area^{1}: 4.25 km^{2} (1.64 sq mi)
- Elevation: 130 m (430 ft)
- Highest elevation: 303 m (994 ft)
- Lowest elevation: 160 m (520 ft)
- Population (2023): 214
  - Density: 50.4/km^{2} (130/sq mi)
- Time zone: UTC+01:00 (CET)
  - Summer (DST): UTC+02:00 (CEST)
- INSEE/Postal code: 19179 /19500
- ^{1} French Land Register data, which excludes lakes, ponds, glaciers > 1 km^{2} (0.386 sq mi or 247 acres) and river estuaries.

Saillac (French pronunciation: [sajak]; Occitan: Salhac) is a commune in the Corrèze department in central France.

== Toponymy ==
In Occitan, the commune is called Salhac.

== Geography ==
=== Location ===
In the south of the Corrèze department, on the border of the Lot department and the Occitanie region, the commune of Saillac extends over 4.25 square kilometres (1,050 acres).

The minimum altitude, 160m, is in the extreme south, on the edge of the Lot department, between Combe Redonde and the Croix de la Mougeinte. The maximum altitude of 303m is located in the north, to the east of the place called La Maison Neuve, on the edge of Collonges-la-Rouge.

== Population ==
Historical population
Year	Pop.	±% p.a.
1968	202	—
1975	165	−2.85%
1982	143	−2.02%
1990	163	+1.65%
1999	157	−0.42%
2007	176	+1.44%
2012	201	+2.69%
2017	205	+0.39%
2023	214	+0.72%
Source: INSEE

== Local culture and heritage ==
=== Places and monuments ===
- Église de la Nativité-de-Saint-Jean-Baptiste - is a fortified church, dedicated to St. John the Baptist, dating from the 12th-century when at that time it was part of a convent church of the abbey the Notre-Dame de la Rule in Limoges. The original apse of the Romanesque church has been destroyed in the past. The polychrome stone tympanum symbolises the Adoration of the Magi, with the Virgin Mary and Child surrounded by Saint Joseph and the three Magi. The lower register shows an angel and winged leopard fighting a sea monster. The porch, with its arcaded side walls, was shortened in the 1800s. The single nave interior dates from 1936 to 1940 while the two chapels were added in the 1850s. It was classified as a historical monument on 23 January 2007.
- Cross, washhouse, oratory, nut mill, blacksmith's work.
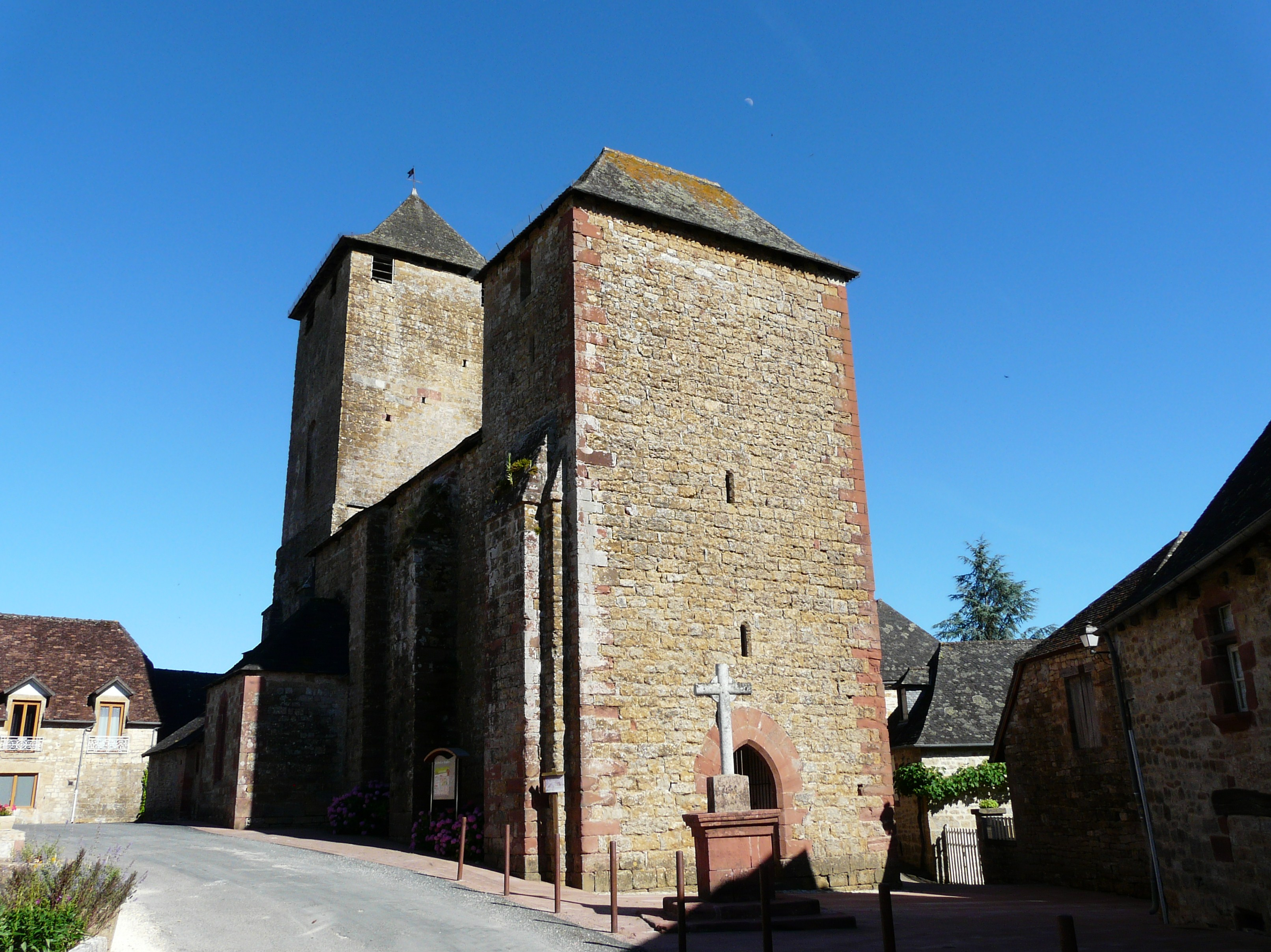
Church.

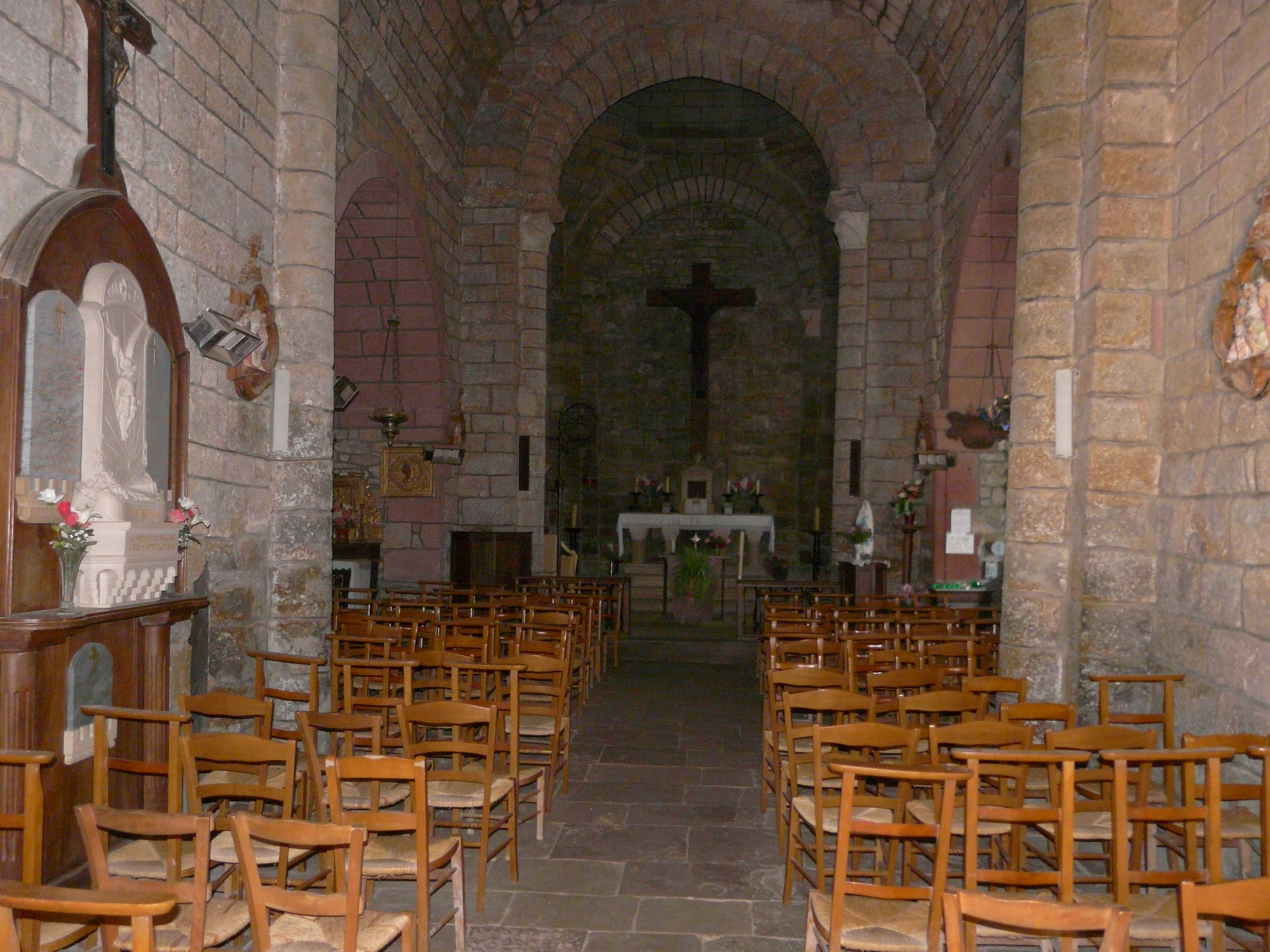
The nave.

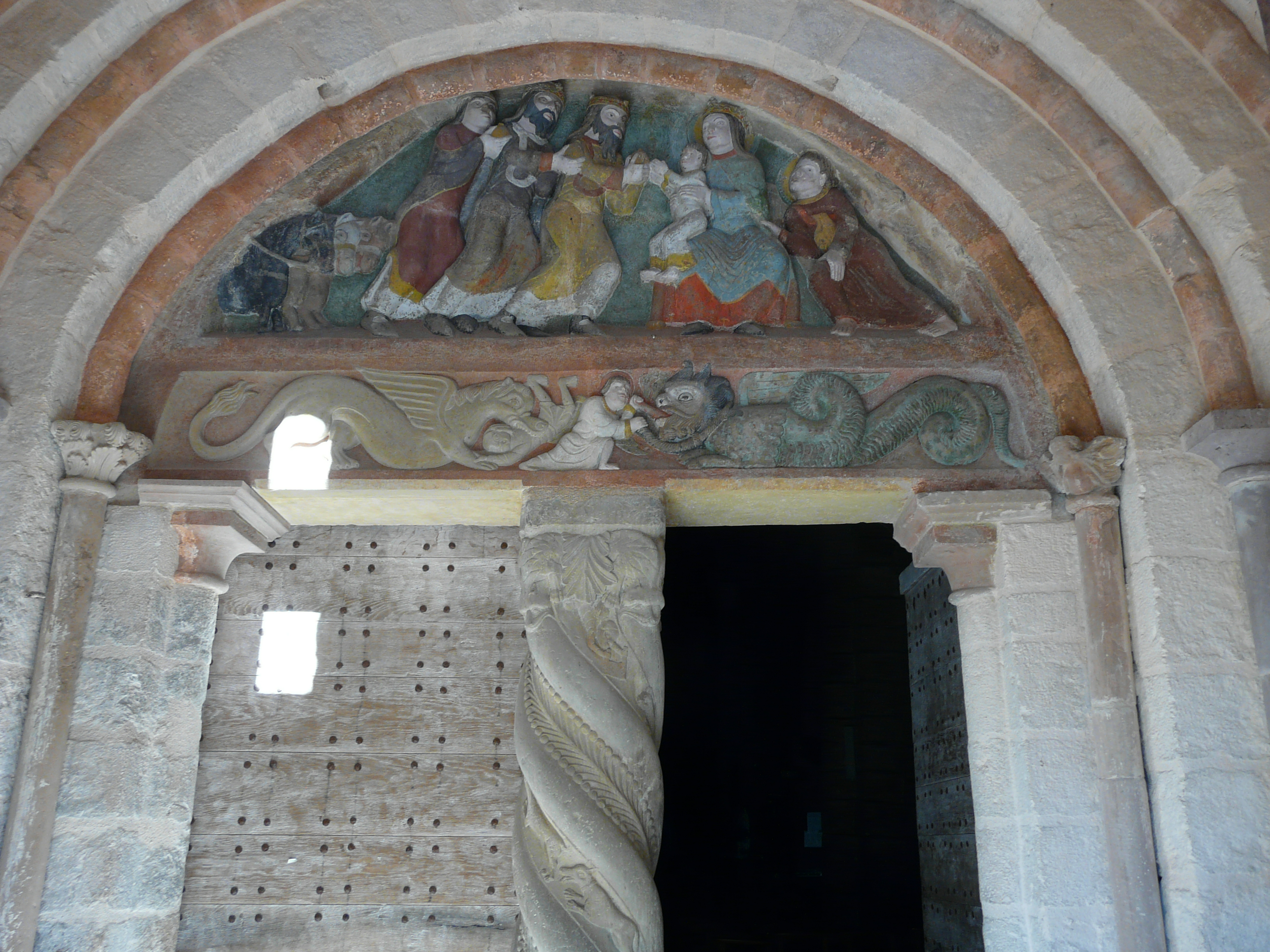
The tympan and porch.

== See also ==
- Communes of the Corrèze department
