= Saint-Julien-Maumont =

- Commune
- Coat of arms
- Location of Saint-Julien-Maumont
- Location within France Location within Nouvelle-Aquitaine
- Coordinates: 45°02′20″N 1°42′24″E
- Country: France
- Region: Nouvelle-Aquitaine
- Department: Corrèze
- Arrondissement: Brive-la-Gaillarde
- Canton: Midi Corrézien
- Intercommunality: Midi Corrézien

Government
  - Mayor (2020–2026): Philippe Longueville
- Area^{1}: 6.21 km^{2} (2.40 sq mi)
- Elevation: 254 m (833 ft)
- Highest elevation: 244 m (801 ft)
- Lowest elevation: 149 m (489 ft)
- Population (2023): 184
  - Density: 29.6/km^{2} (76.7/sq mi)
- Time zone: UTC+01:00 (CET)
  - Summer (DST): UTC+02:00 (CEST)
- INSEE/Postal code: 19217 /19500
- ^{1} French Land Register data, which excludes lakes, ponds, glaciers > 1 km^{2} (0.386 sq mi or 247 acres) and river estuaries.

Saint-Julien-Maumont (Limousin: Sent Julian Momon) is a commune in the Corrèze department in central France.

== History ==
In 1793, the communes of Saint-Julien and Maumont merged under the name of Saint-Julien-Maumont. Following a decree of the Convention, the commune changed its name to Monmont-et-Lime.

== Population ==
Historical population
Year	Pop.	±% p.a.
1968	196	—
1975	195	−0.07%
1982	161	−2.70%
1990	157	−0.31%
1999	155	−0.14%
2007	160	+0.40%
2012	182	+2.61%
2017	157	−2.91%
2023	184	+2.68%
Source: INSEE

== Personalities ==
- Pierre Roger, Pope Clement VI
- Pierre Roger de Beaufort, Pope Gregory XI

== See also ==
- Communes of the Corrèze department
