= Espartignac =

- Commune
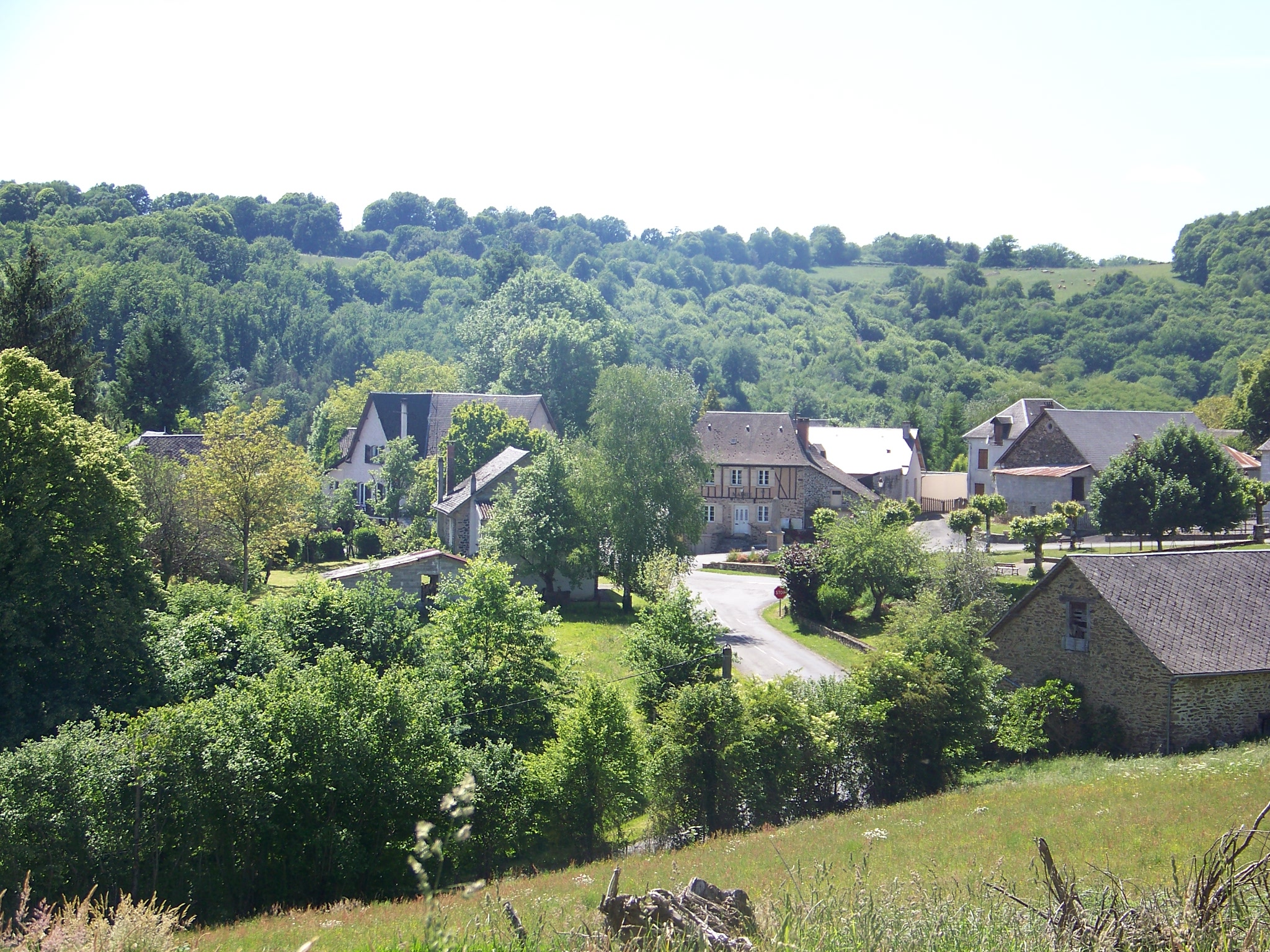
- A general view of Espartignac

- Coat of arms
- Location of Espartignac
- Location within France Location within Nouvelle-Aquitaine
- Coordinates: 45°24′56″N 1°35′47″E
- Country: France
- Region: Nouvelle-Aquitaine
- Department: Corrèze
- Arrondissement: Tulle
- Canton: Uzerche
- Intercommunality: Pays d'Uzerche

Government
  - Mayor (2020–2026): Jean-Michel Faugeras
- Area^{1}: 14.03 km^{2} (5.42 sq mi)
- Elevation: 350 m (1,150 ft)
- Highest elevation: 472 m (1,549 ft)
- Lowest elevation: 292 m (958 ft)
- Population (2023): 407
  - Density: 29.0/km^{2} (75.1/sq mi)
- Time zone: UTC+01:00 (CET)
  - Summer (DST): UTC+02:00 (CEST)
- INSEE/Postal code: 19076 /19140
- ^{1} French Land Register data, which excludes lakes, ponds, glaciers > 1 km^{2} (0.386 sq mi or 247 acres) and river estuaries.

Espartignac (French pronunciation: [ɛspaʁtiɲak]; Occitan: Espartinhac) is a commune in the Corrèze department in central France.

Espartignac is generally rural, the nature are attractive and green village, although is less important in much of the Corrèze department due to the migration to Tulle, which is the capital of the department. The commune which is primarily the agricultural sector (largely decidated to raising animals, which is can be more similar nearby to Uzerche; fruit and vegetable field crops are considered little as much of the department.) while the teritary services likely being lesser degree since low population.

== Etymology ==
The origin of the name Espartignac comes from Spartinius, the name of a Gallo-Roman figure who owned the place. The suffix acum (ac) indicates ownership.

The name of the commune is Espartinhac in Occitan, which is spoken as Limousin dialect.

== History ==
Espartignac, whose church is known from 1100, has its roots in ancient prehistory.

A long road from the Atlantic to the Mediterranean crosses the Vézère River at the Gué du Champ, protected by several defensive structures.

Along this path, used from prehistory to the Middle Ages, there are several good fountains and religious buildings. Only the current church, dedicated to Saint Martial, remains, with the good fountain of the same name below, said to cure scabies.

At the other end of the parish, Ceyrat has its own destiny with its church (Saint Nicholas then Notre-Dame) and today benefits from the proximity of the RN 120 and the A20 motorway.

The Uzerche-Tulle narrow-gauge railway that served Espartignac has disappeared, putting the capital at a disadvantage.

After the year 1000, the abbeys of Uzerche and Vigeois shared the parish, and in the 18th century, it was the Abbot of Uzerche and the Marquis of Saint-Jal.

In mid-November 1942, during the Nazi Germany occupation, the first parachute drop of weapons took place at Salon-la-Tour (failure) and Espartignac (success).

== Geography ==
Espartignac is located in west-central France, on the western edge of the Massif Central.

The commune's terrain are ranging to plains to hills, where it usually the plains are covered by agriculture or prairie while the hills are usually forest.

Espartignac is located, as the crow flies, 4 km southeast of Uzerche, 28 km northwest of the prefecture of Tulle, 37 km north of Brive-la-Gaillarde, and 382 km from Paris.

=== Neighboring communes ===
The commune's territory borders eight other communes.

The neighboring communes are Condat-sur-Ganaveix, Eyburie, Lagraulière, Perpezac-le-Noir, Pierrefitte, Saint-Jal, Uzerche, and Vigeois.

=== Geology and relief ===
The commune's territory, which covers 1,403 hectares, is hilly, covered with hedgerows, woods, and copses.

Espartignac, like the entire canton of Uzerche, sits on soil composed primarily of gneiss.

=== Hydrology ===
The town is crossed by several waterways:

- The Vézère river;
- The Pont Lagorce stream, a tributary of the Brézou river;
- The Rujoux river, the Troh stream, and the Anglard stream, tributaries of the Vézère river.

=== Climate ===
Historically, the commune lies in a transition zone between the Aquitaine oceanic and mountain climates. In 2020, Météo-France published a typology of the climates of metropolitan France, in which the commune is in a transition zone between the altered oceanic climate and the mountain climate, and is located in the western and northwestern Massif Central climate region, characterized by an annual rainfall of 900 to 1,500 mm, peaking in autumn and winter.

For the period 1971–2000, the average annual temperature was 11.2 °C, with an annual temperature range of 15 °C. The average annual cumulative precipitation was 1,257 mm, with 13 days of precipitation in January and 7.9 days in July. For the period 1991-2020, the average annual temperature observed at the nearest weather station, located in Uzerche 3 km as the crow flies, is 12.1 °C and the average annual cumulative precipitation is 1,097.9 mm. Looking ahead, the climatic parameters of the municipality estimated for 2050 according to different greenhouse gas emission scenarios can be consulted on a dedicated website published by Météo-France in November 2022.

== Communications and transport ==
To reach Espartignac by road, take exit 45 off the A20 motorway.

The nearest train station is Uzerche, 5 km away (see Uzerche station).

The nearest airports are Limoges-Bellegarde (76 km) and Brive-Vallée de la Dordogne (50 km).

== Politics and administration ==
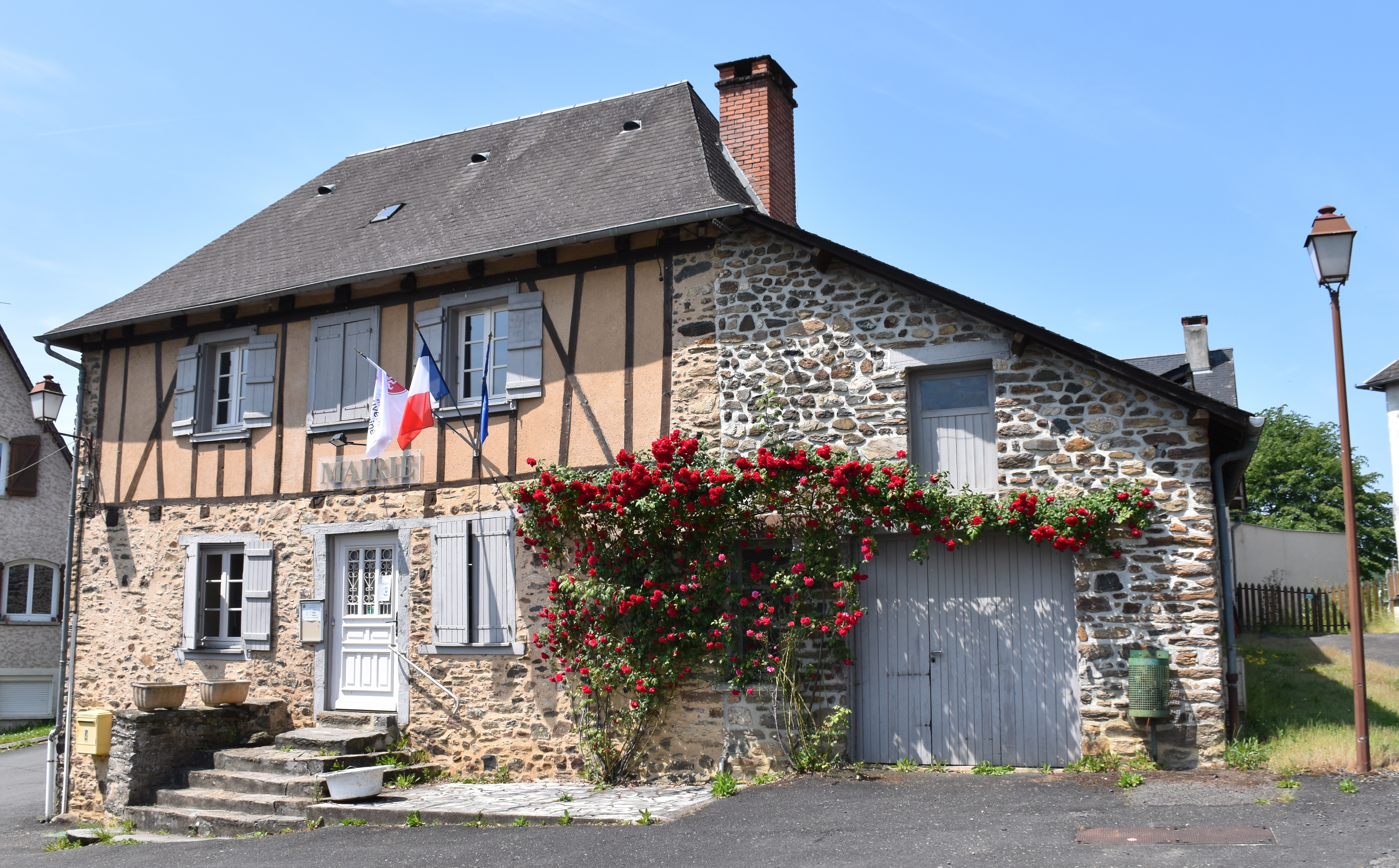
center the town hall.

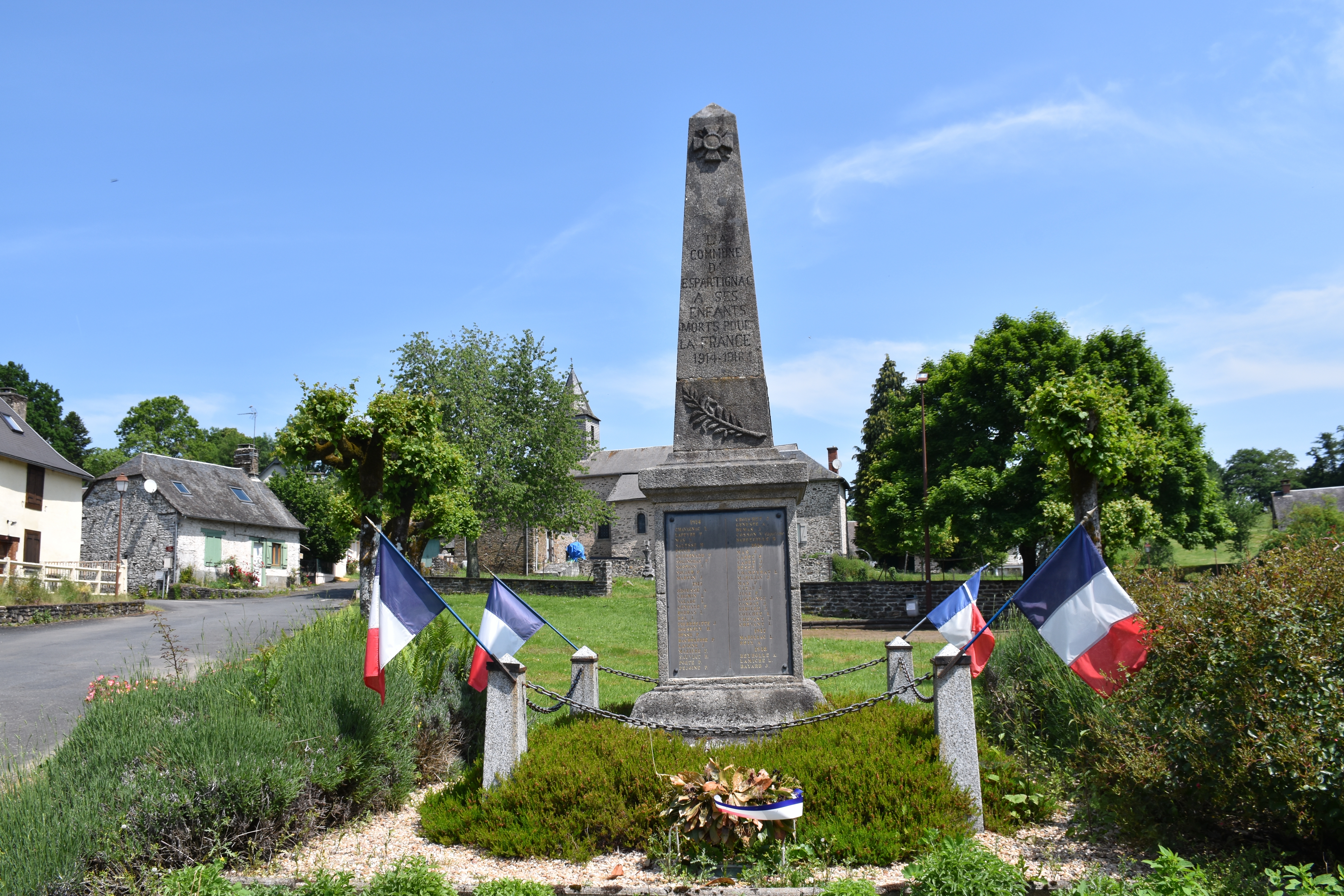
The war memorial.

=== Municipal administration ===
The municipality has a municipal council of 11 members (article L2121-2 of the General Code of Local Authorities).

=== Sustainable development policy ===
The municipality has implemented a sustainable development policy by launching an Agenda 21 initiative in 2008.

A voluntary recycling drop-off point (plastic and packaging) is available at Bois Lafage and Le Bourg; for glass, containers are available in the village, at La Borie and Bois Lafage.

The nearest recycling center is Uzerche, 2.8 km away.

=== Intercommunality ===
Espartignac is a member of the Community of Communes of the Pays d'Uzerche, which is made up of twelve communes.

== Education and services ==
The commune is in inter-school grouping with that of Saint-Jal: the children go from nursery school to CE1 in Saint-Jal, then to the public primary school Marguerite Noilletas, from CE2 to CM2, in Espartignac. Then, the pupils go to the Gaucelm-Faidit college in Uzerche. The nearest high schools are those of Brive-la-Gaillarde and those of Tulle.

=== Health ===
In Espartignac, there is no doctor, but there is a nursing practice. The nearest hospitals are located in Brive-la-Gaillarde (37 km), Tulle (28 km), and Limoges (65 km).

== Urban planning ==
=== Typology ===
As of January 1, 2024, Espartignac is categorized as a rural commune with very dispersed housing, according to the new 7-level communal density grid defined by INSEE in 2022. It is located outside an urban unit. Furthermore, the commune is part of the Uzerche catchment area, of which it is a suburban commune. This area, which includes 8 communes, is categorized as an area with fewer than 50,000 inhabitants.

=== Land use ===
The commune's land use, as shown in the European Corine Land Cover (CLC) biophysical land use database, is marked by the significant proportion of agricultural land (85.4% in 2018), a proportion roughly equivalent to that of 1990 (85%). The detailed breakdown in 2018 is as follows: grasslands (46.5%), mixed agricultural areas (38.9%), forests (14.3%), industrial or commercial zones, and communication networks (0.3%).

The evolution of the commune's land use and its infrastructure can be observed on various cartographic representations of the territory: the Cassini map (18th century), the general staff map (1820-1866), and IGN maps or aerial photographs for the current period (1950 to the present).

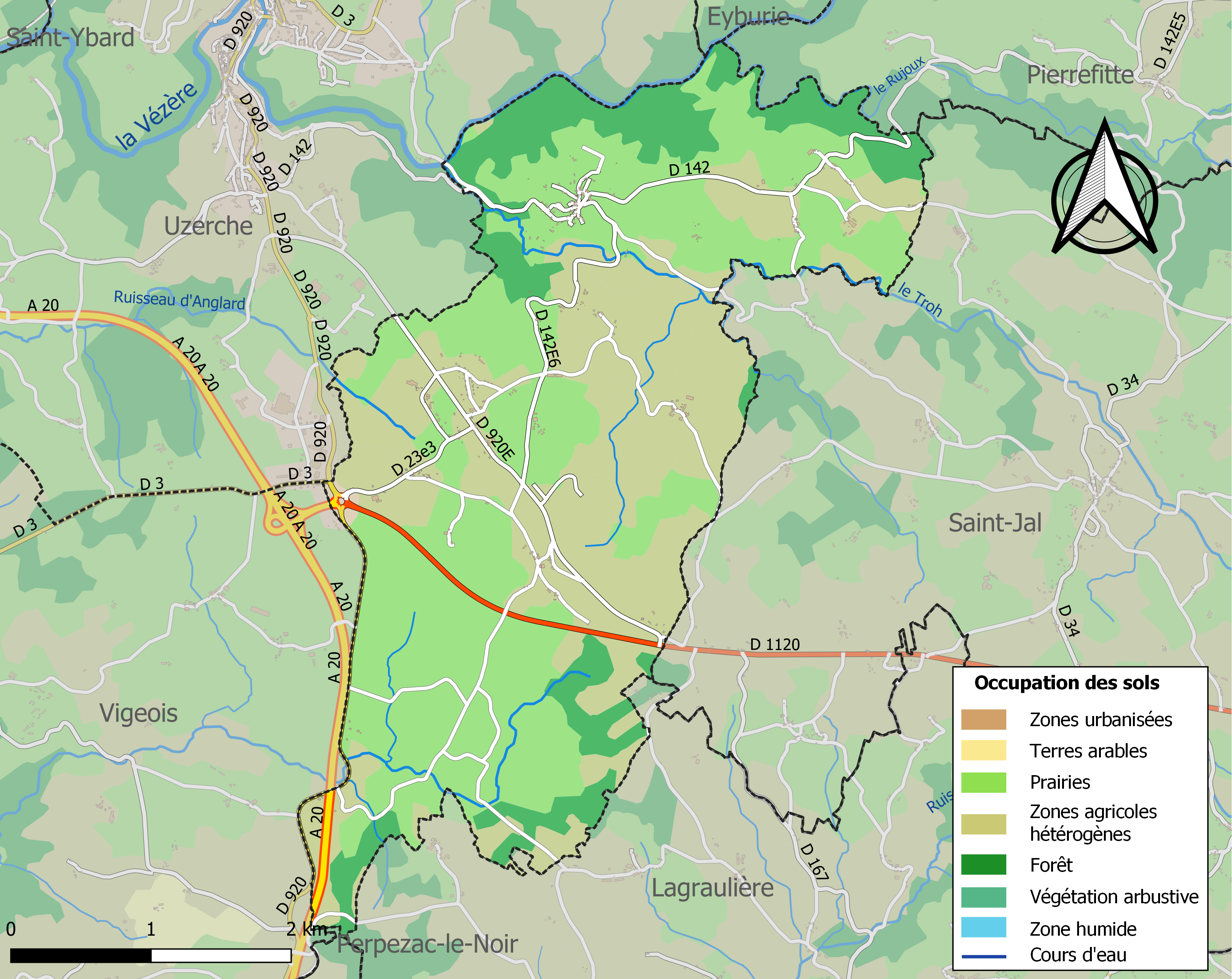
Map of infrastructure and land use in the commune in 2018 (CLC).

=== Road transport ===
- Corrèze interurban network, connects various communes such as Uzerche, Brive-la-Gaillarde, Donzenac, Tulle, Égletons and Ussel. It is connects mainly of entire department.

=== Major risks ===
The territory of the commune of Espartignac is vulnerable to various natural hazards: weather (storms, thunderstorms, snow, extreme cold, heatwaves or drought), floods, forest fires and earthquakes (very low seismicity). It is also exposed to two technological risks: the transport of hazardous materials and dam failure. A website published by BRGM allows you to simply and quickly assess the risks of a property located either by its address or by its plot number.

==== Natural risks ====
Certain parts of the communal territory are likely to be affected by the risk of flooding due to overflowing watercourses, particularly the Vézère. The commune has been declared to be in a state of natural disaster due to the damage caused by floods and mudslides that occurred in 1982, 1999 and 2001. Flood risk is taken into account in the town's land use planning through the "Vézère" flood risk prevention plan (PPR), approved on 29 August 2002.

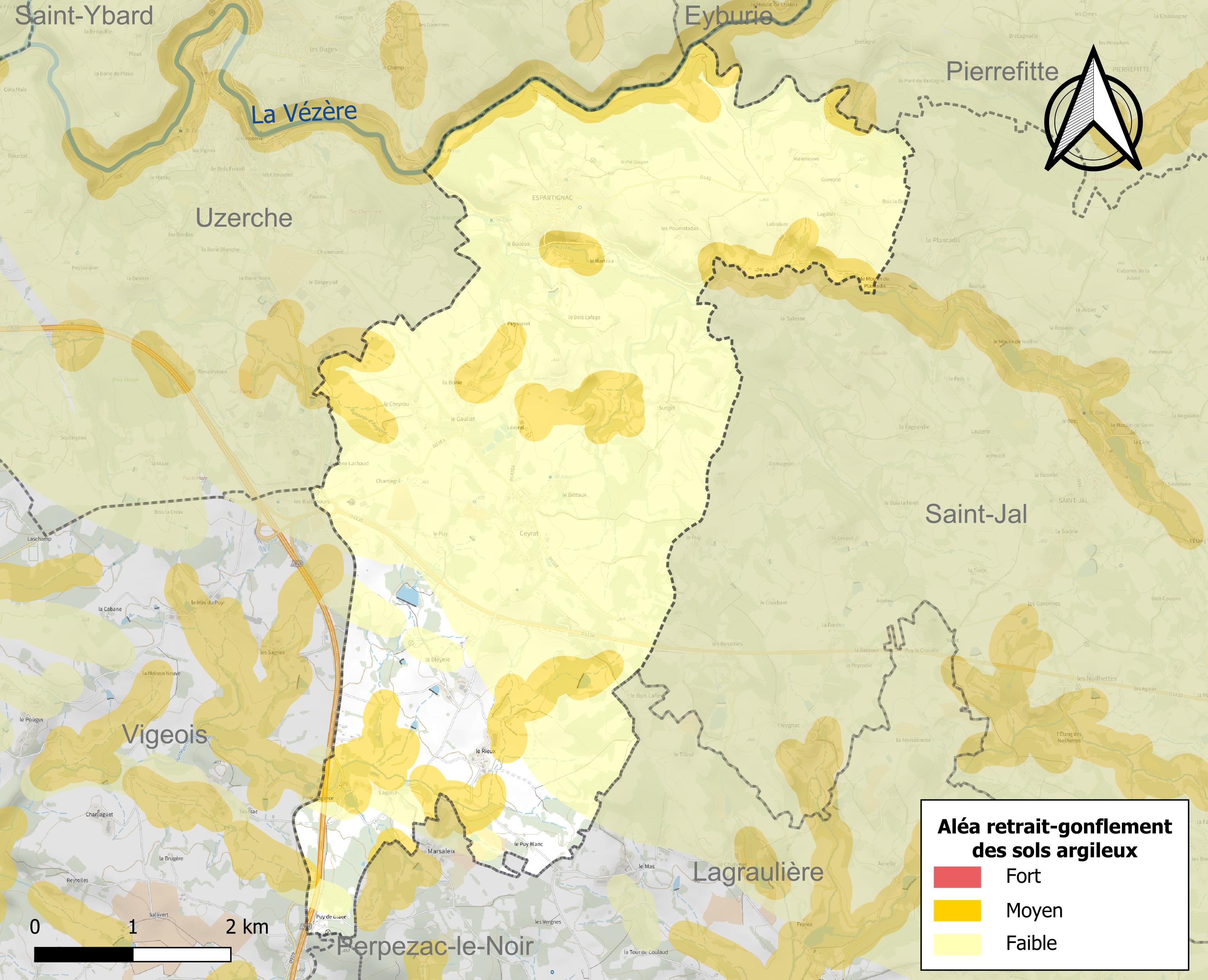
Map of the shrinkage-swelling hazard zones of the clay soils of Espartignac.

The shrinkage-swelling of clay soils can cause significant damage to buildings in the event of alternating periods of drought and rain. 18.1% of the commune area is at medium or high risk (26.8% at the departmental level and 48.5% at the national level). Of the 236 buildings counted in the commune in 2019, 23 are at medium or high risk, or 10%, compared to 36% at the departmental level and 54% at the national level. A map of the national territory's exposure to the shrinkage-swelling of clay soils is available on the BRGM website.

Regarding forest fires, no forest fire risk prevention plan (PPRIF) has been established in Corrèze; however, the urban planning code requires that risks be taken into account in urban planning documents. The perimeter of public utility easements and areas where private individuals are legally required to clear brush is defined for the commune on a dedicated map.

Regarding landslides, the commune has been declared a natural disaster site due to damage caused by drought in 2020 and landslides in 1999.

==== Technological risks ====
The risk of hazardous materials being transported in the commune is linked to its crossing by a busy road. An accident occurring on such infrastructure is likely to have serious impacts on property, people, or the environment, depending on the nature of the material being transported. Urban planning provisions may be recommended accordingly.

The commune is also located downstream from the Monceaux la Virolle dam, a Class A structure located in Corrèze and with a reservoir of 20.5 million cubic meters. As such, it is likely to be affected by the flood wave following the failure of this structure.

== Demographics ==
Inhabitants of the commune are called Espartignacois in French.

=== Demographic evolution ===
The population peaked in 1851 with 732 inhabitants.

Historical population

Year	Pop.	±% p.a.
1793	506	—
1851	732	+0.64%
1901	697	−0.10%
1962	299	−1.38%
1968	326	+1.45%
1975	321	−0.22%
1982	344	+0.99%

Year	Pop.	±% p.a.
1990	342	−0.07%
1999	385	+1.32%
2007	367	−0.60%
2012	410	+2.24%
2017	441	+1.47%
2023	407	−1.33%

Source: EHESS and INSEE (1968-2023)

=== Age pyramid ===
The commune's population is relatively elderly. In 2018, the percentage of people under 30 years of age was 23.9%, below the departmental average (28.7%). Conversely, the percentage of people over 60 years of age was 37.4% in the same year, compared to 34.7% at the departmental level.

In 2018, the commune had 203 men for every 225 women, representing a female ratio of 52.57%, slightly higher than the departmental rate (51.47%).

=== Sports and leisure ===
The P.O.C. and Dolmen hike (6.3 km), starting from the village, will allow you to discover the sites and monuments of Espartignac.

=== Cults ===
For Catholic worship, Espartignac depends on the diocese of Tulle, and is part of the inter-parish group of Uzerche-Vigeois: the deanery of Moyenne Vézère.

== Economy ==
In 2008, the median taxable income per household was €17,053, which placed Espartignac 17,049th among the 31,604 municipalities with more than 50 households in metropolitan France.

The employment rate in 2007 was 45.6% for the 15-24 age group, 93.9% for the 25-54 age group, and 38.7% for the 55-64 age group. In 2007, 76% of men were employed, compared to 70.1% of women.

In 2007, 19.3% of employed people aged 15 and over residing in the commune worked in Espartignac, 73.5% in another commune in Corrèze, and 6% in another department in the region.

== Culture ==
=== Historic and military buildings ===
==== Feudal mound, 10th century - 12th century ====
The Château-l'Abbaye mound was probably erected around the year 1000, in the Espartignac forest.

The name of the site, also found under the name Bois l'Abbé, is linked to a donation from the Viscount of Comborn to the monks of the Abbey of Uzerche (1072, in the Uzerche cartulary).

It is a mound of earth protected naturally by the Vézère river and artificially by ditches with ramparts and wooden palisades. A square wooden tower, now disappeared, stood on the summit platform. The carpet of small periwinkles (ruderal plants) in the lower courtyard attests to human occupation. This defensive structure controlled the ford over the Vézère River, used by the Precious Metals Route (from Armorica to the Mediterranean), which passes nearby.

==== Lookout post ====
On the site of the feudal mound of Château-l’Abbaye, the lookout post known as the Maison du Loup is listed as a historic monument as a dolmen. In reality, it is a shelter built into the rocks to monitor the ford on the Vézère, used by the Precious Metals trade route. The place is accessible by a narrow path, at the western end of the site.

==== Religious buildings ====
===== Saint Martin or Saint Martial Church, 13th century - 19th century =====
The small church of Espartignac is considered the oldest in the canton. It is mentioned in the second will of Saint Yrieix, dated 572, where he gave it to the Abbey of Vigeois. The cartularies mention three churches associated with three good fountains in the 11th and 12th centuries: Saint Peter, Saint Martin, and Saint Martial.

The current church is dedicated to Saint Martin. However, Saint Martial is celebrated there, a cult associated with the fountain of the same name, very close to the church.

The oldest part is the façade with its portal decorated in the 13th-century Limousin Romanesque style.

Inside, the main altar of the choir is flanked by two altars in the arms of the transept, dedicated respectively to the Blessed Virgin and Saint Martial. The altar of Saint Martial contains a reliquary containing a piece of the saint's bone.

===== 7th century sarcophagi =====
North of the current cemetery, in a plot called Las Chapelas, two trapezoidal limestone sarcophagi, without a cephalic reserve, were discovered by chance in 1977, under a granite slab. They lean against a rock at a depth of 0.85 m.

The sarcophagus displayed in the church contained a male skeleton. A second sarcophagus contained a female skeleton, her hands crossed over her chest. These sarcophagi date from the Merovingian period.

==== Contemporary monuments ====
===== 20th century war memorial =====
The war memorial stands in the center of the village to commemorate the sacrifice of 50 Espartignac children who died for France during the First World War (1914-1918).

A second, very moving black plaque is affixed to the stele, inscribed in gold letters with the names of six young Espartignac patriots. One, conscripted, died in 1940. Two others were shot in June 1944 by German soldiers. The other three were arrested, deported, and died in the Nazi camps.

Photos of these martyrs are affixed near their names to perpetuate their memory.

==== Other monuments ====
===== Saint-Martial Fountain =====
The Saint-Martial fountain is mentioned in ancient texts recounting the 3rd-century visit of Saint-Martial, the evangelizer of Limousin.

A legend is linked to his passage through Espartignac one summer day. On his way, he met a woman carrying water that she had just fetched further away. He asked her for a little water to quench her thirst, but the woman passed by without stopping. Displeased with her refusal, he said to her: "You might regret it, for I have come to bring you good news, and I am a friend of God. Look and see how I avenge your refusal." And, striking the ground with his staff, he caused a clear spring to gush forth, the water of which still flows. It flows into a granite basin about 100 meters from the church.

The water from the Saint-Martial fountain is said to be effective against scabies and skin diseases. Since the 2004 symposium, the sculpture "The Nymph Preparing to Bathe" has been installed there.

===== Hammer Mill mid-17th century =====
Near the intersection of the GR 46 with the road to the village of Espartignac, you'll see a mill behind a curtain of trees. This is the Marteau mill, on the stream called the Troh. The mill is very old. A notarial deed from 1677 (a tenancy agreement) mentions it. In the 17th century, it operated in several capacities. It was a hemp-threshing mill (the word "marteau" refers to mallets), a wheat mill, and an oil mill.

It ceased operation in 1958. The waterwheel is recent. The owner rehabilitated the mill for other purposes. It is not open to visitors.

=== Natural heritage ===
==== Al Gaulhia Arboretum ====
This landscaped park, opened in 2011, covers an area of 10 hectares.

Peat bogs, bodies of water, drylands, and wetlands offer a wide variety of flora and fauna. Along the trail, you can discover nearly 400 plant species: from ancient chestnut trees, awarded the "Remarkable Trees of France" label, to bamboo, passing alongside water lilies, lotuses, and various grasses.

=== Personalities linked to the commune ===
Daniel Esmoingt, sculptor, died on February 28, 2019. A graduate of the École Nationale des Beaux Arts in Paris, he attended the Belmondo workshop. He participated annually in archaeological missions in Egypt (West Thebes). He notably created the group "Imperial France" by Jean-Baptiste Carpeaux (pediment of the Pavillon de Flore at the Palais du Louvre) and that of the Geniuses at the Louvre Museum. Restorer of sculptures for churches, creator, he participated in national and international exhibitions. Creator of the sculpture symposium of the Pays d'Uzerche in 2004. The sculptures can be seen in various places in the canton of Uzerche. Notably in Espartignac au Bourg, in Ceyrat, at Champ Long, on the Voie du Poc, etc. (Brochure available at the town hall.)

=== Heraldry ===
The coat of arms of the commune was adopted in May 29, 2021, Created by Jean-Claude Molinier.

The chief takes up part of the arms of the house of Comborn; the crosier at the tip of which a spring gushes evokes the fountain of Saint-Martial, the sword and the coat evoke Saint Martin, patron of the parish; finally, the mallet represents the Marteau mill, where hemp was beaten.

Arms of Espartignac	Azure, a crozier or, issuing from a spring argent, springing from the point, adextrous with a low sword placed in a bend and cutting a mantle and sinister with a mallet placed in a bar, all argent, with a chief wavy or charged with a lion leoparded gules.

== See also ==
- Communes of the Corrèze department
