= Saint-Ybard =

- Part of Les Trois-Saints
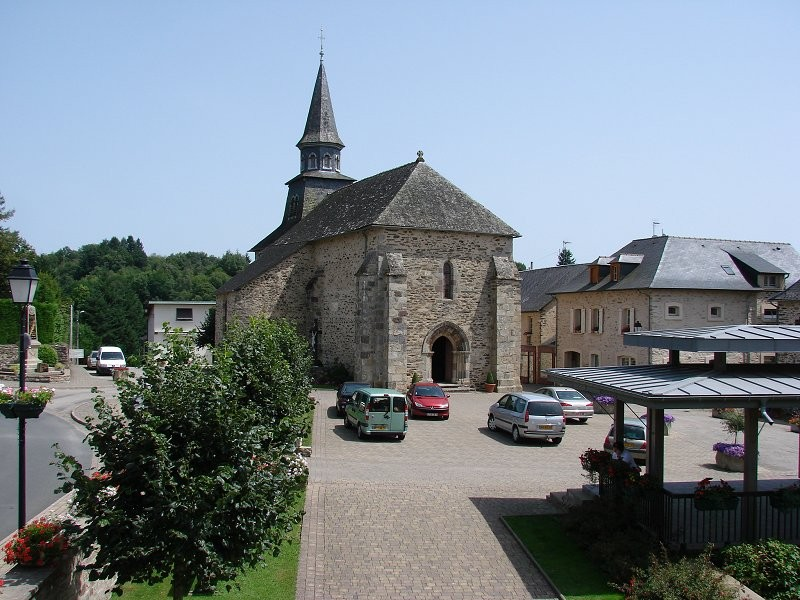
- The church in Saint-Ybard

- Coat of arms
- Location of Saint-Ybard
- Location within France Location within Nouvelle-Aquitaine
- Coordinates: 45°26′56″N 1°31′21″E
- Country: France
- Region: Nouvelle-Aquitaine
- Department: Corrèze
- Arrondissement: Tulle
- Canton: Uzerche
- Commune: Les Trois-Saints
- Area^{1}: 30.05 km^{2} (11.60 sq mi)
- Elevation: 395 m (1,296 ft)
- Highest elevation: 497 m (1,631 ft)
- Lowest elevation: 270 m (890 ft)
- Population (2023): 731
  - Density: 24.3/km^{2} (63.0/sq mi)
- Time zone: UTC+01:00 (CET)
  - Summer (DST): UTC+02:00 (CEST)
- Postal code: 19140
- ^{1} French Land Register data, which excludes lakes, ponds, glaciers > 1 km^{2} (0.386 sq mi or 247 acres) and river estuaries.

Saint-Ybard (French pronunciation: [sɛ̃.t‿ibaʁ]; Occitan: Sanch Ibarch) is a former commune in the Corrèze department in central France. It was merged with Saint-Pardoux-Corbier and Saint-Martin-Sepert to form Les Trois-Saints on 1 January 2025.

== See also ==
- Communes of the Corrèze department
