= Saint-Pardoux-Corbier =

- Part of Les Trois-Saints
- Coat of arms
- Location of Saint-Pardoux-Corbier
- Location within France Location within Nouvelle-Aquitaine
- Coordinates: 45°25′57″N 1°27′07″E
- Country: France
- Region: Nouvelle-Aquitaine
- Department: Corrèze
- Arrondissement: Brive-la-Gaillarde
- Canton: Uzerche
- Commune: Les Trois-Saints
- Area^{1}: 17.44 km^{2} (6.73 sq mi)
- Elevation: 400 m (1,300 ft)
- Highest elevation: 454 m (1,490 ft)
- Lowest elevation: 335 m (1,099 ft)
- Population (2023): 389
  - Density: 22.3/km^{2} (57.8/sq mi)
- Time zone: UTC+01:00 (CET)
  - Summer (DST): UTC+02:00 (CEST)
- Postal code: 19210
- ^{1} French Land Register data, which excludes lakes, ponds, glaciers > 1 km^{2} (0.386 sq mi or 247 acres) and river estuaries.

Saint-Pardoux-Corbier (French pronunciation: [sɛ̃ paʁdu kɔʁbje]; Limousin: Sent Pardos Corbier) is a former commune in the Corrèze department in central France. It was merged with Saint-Martin-Sepert and Saint-Ybard to form Les Trois-Saints on 1 January 2025.

== See also ==
- Communes of the Corrèze department
