= Saint-Martin-Sepert =

- Part of Les Trois-Saints
- Coat of arms
- Location of Saint-Martin-Sepert
- Location within France Location within Nouvelle-Aquitaine
- Coordinates: 45°26′07″N 1°28′20″E
- Country: France
- Region: Nouvelle-Aquitaine
- Department: Corrèze
- Arrondissement: Brive-la-Gaillarde
- Canton: Uzerche
- Commune: Les Trois-Saints
- Area^{1}: 15.71 km^{2} (6.07 sq mi)
- Elevation: 390 m (1,280 ft)
- Highest elevation: 483 m (1,585 ft)
- Lowest elevation: 335 m (1,099 ft)
- Population (2023): 268
  - Density: 17.1/km^{2} (44.2/sq mi)
- Time zone: UTC+01:00 (CET)
  - Summer (DST): UTC+02:00 (CEST)
- Postal code: 19210
- ^{1} French Land Register data, which excludes lakes, ponds, glaciers > 1 km^{2} (0.386 sq mi or 247 acres) and river estuaries.

Saint-Martin-Sepert (French pronunciation: [sɛ̃ maʁtɛ̃ səpɛʁ]; Limousin: Sent Martin Set Pers) is a former commune in the Corrèze department in central France. It was merged with Saint-Pardoux-Corbier and Saint-Ybard to form Les Trois-Saints on 1 January 2025.

== See also ==
- Communes of the Corrèze department
