= La Porcherie =

- Commune
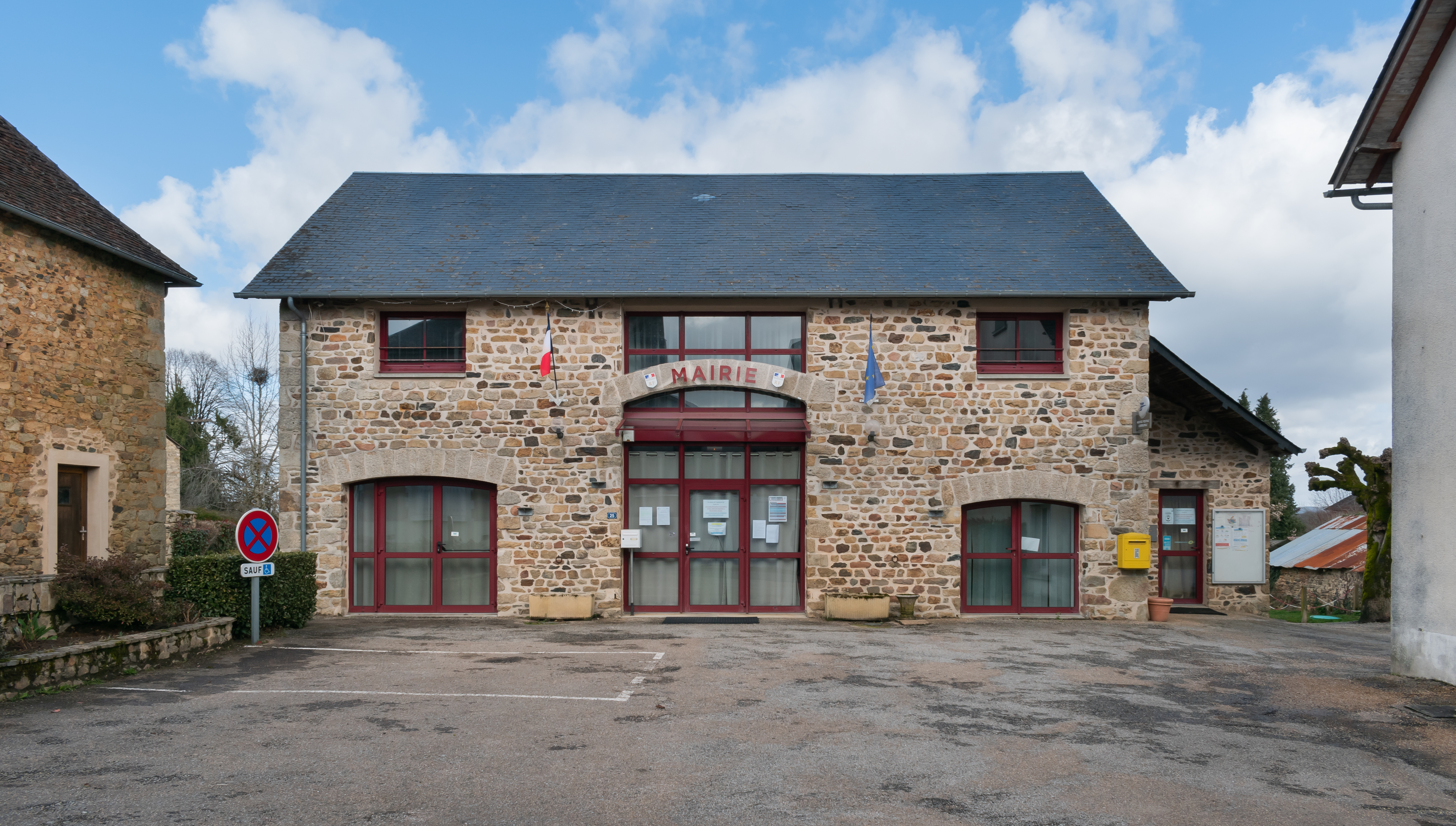
- Town hall
- Location of La Porcherie
- Location within France Location within Nouvelle-Aquitaine
- Coordinates: 45°34′55″N 1°32′42″E
- Country: France
- Region: Nouvelle-Aquitaine
- Department: Haute-Vienne
- Arrondissement: Limoges
- Canton: Eymoutiers

Government
  - Mayor (2020–2026): Michel Mouret
- Area^{1}: 31.34 km^{2} (12.10 sq mi)
- Highest elevation: 539 m (1,768 ft)
- Lowest elevation: 399 m (1,309 ft)
- Population (2023): 531
  - Density: 16.9/km^{2} (43.9/sq mi)
- Time zone: UTC+01:00 (CET)
  - Summer (DST): UTC+02:00 (CEST)
- INSEE/Postal code: 87120 /87380
- ^{1} French Land Register data, which excludes lakes, ponds, glaciers > 1 km^{2} (0.386 sq mi or 247 acres) and river estuaries.

La Porcherie (French pronunciation: [la pɔʁʃəʁi]; Occitan: La Porcharia) is a commune in the Haute-Vienne department in the Nouvelle-Aquitaine region in west-central France. La Porcherie station has rail connections to Brive-la-Gaillarde and Limoges.

== Notable people ==
- Jacques-Arsène d'Arsonval (8 June 1851 – 31 December 1940): French physician and physicist, born in Château de la Borie, in La Porcherie; inventor of the moving-coil D'Arsonval galvanometer and the thermocouple ammeter. D'Arsonval was an important contributor to the emerging field of electrophysiology, the study of the effects of electricity on biological organisms, in the 19th century.

== See also ==
- Communes of the Haute-Vienne department
