= Meilhards =

- Commune
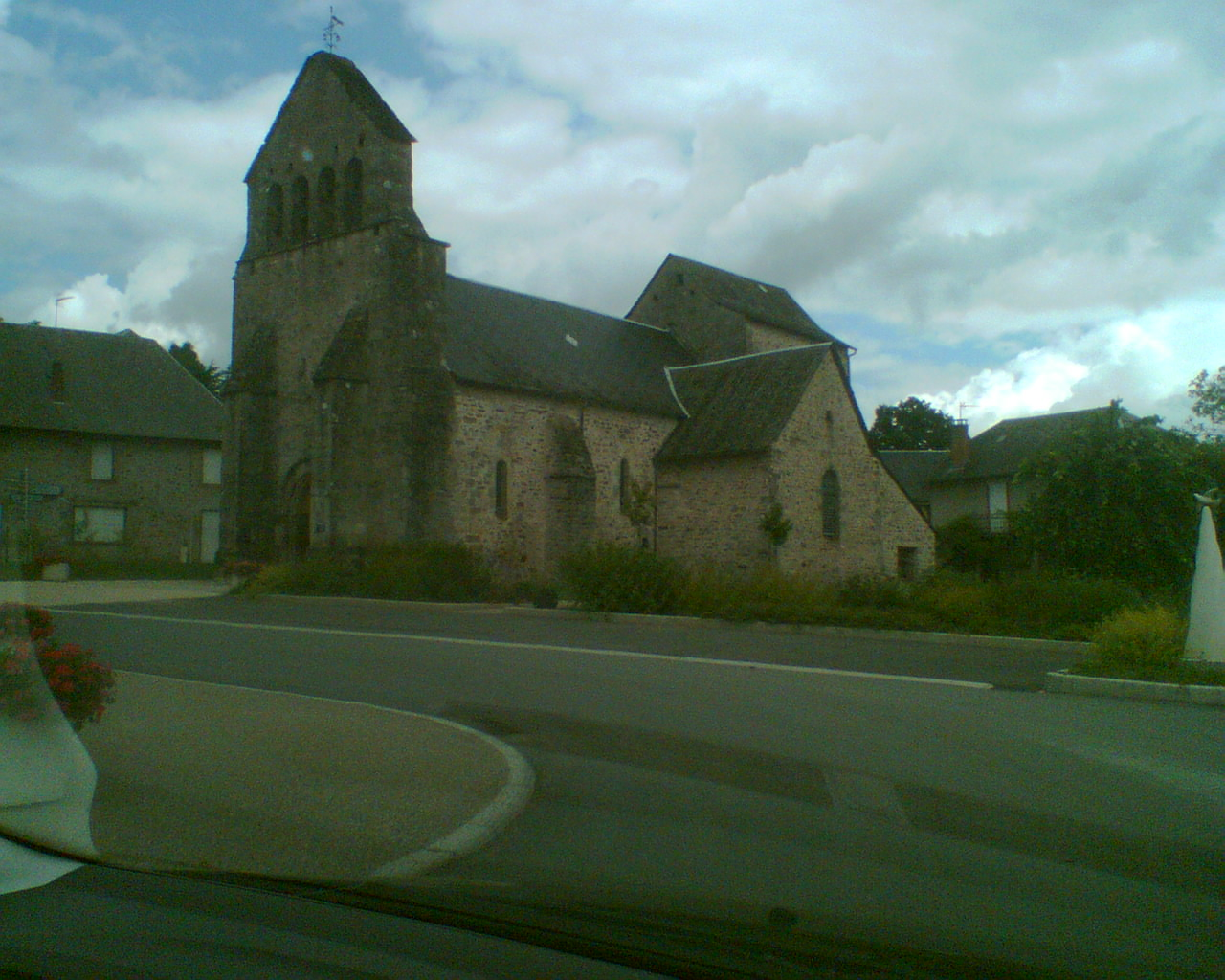
- The church in Meilhards

- Coat of arms
- Location of Meilhards
- Location within France Location within Nouvelle-Aquitaine
- Coordinates: 45°33′37″N 1°38′59″E
- Country: France
- Region: Nouvelle-Aquitaine
- Department: Corrèze
- Arrondissement: Tulle
- Canton: Uzerche
- Intercommunality: Pays d'Uzerche

Government
  - Mayor (2020–2026): Jean-Jacques Caffy
- Area^{1}: 44.99 km^{2} (17.37 sq mi)
- Elevation: 380 m (1,250 ft)
- Highest elevation: 580 m (1,900 ft)
- Lowest elevation: 377 m (1,237 ft)
- Population (2023): 545
  - Density: 12.1/km^{2} (31.4/sq mi)
- Time zone: UTC+01:00 (CET)
  - Summer (DST): UTC+02:00 (CEST)
- INSEE/Postal code: 19131 /19510
- ^{1} French Land Register data, which excludes lakes, ponds, glaciers > 1 km^{2} (0.386 sq mi or 247 acres) and river estuaries.

Meilhards (French pronunciation: [mɛjaʁ]; Occitan: Melhars) is a commune in the Corrèze department in central France.

== Geography ==
=== Location ===
The municipality is bordered by the department of Haute-Vienne.

=== Hydrography ===
Commune watered by the Bradascou, and its tributary the Ganaveix which takes its source in the communal territory.

=== Population ===
Historical population
Year	Pop.	±% p.a.
1968	897	—
1975	789	−1.82%
1982	700	−1.70%
1990	622	−1.47%
1999	519	−1.99%
2007	529	+0.24%
2012	514	−0.57%
2017	517	+0.12%
2023	545	+0.88%
Source: INSEE

== Local Culture and heritage ==
=== Places and monuments ===
- Château de Lachaud
- Tomb of Philippe de Meilhards XVIII, classified by the fine Arts.
- 14th Century Church.
- Chapelle Sainte-Radegonde with miraculous fountain.

=== Cults ===
For the Catholic cults, Meilhards depended on the diocese of Tulle, and is part of the inter-parochial ensemble of Chambert-Treignac: The deanery of the Middle Vézère.

== See also ==
- Communes of the Corrèze department
