= Beyssenac =

- Commune
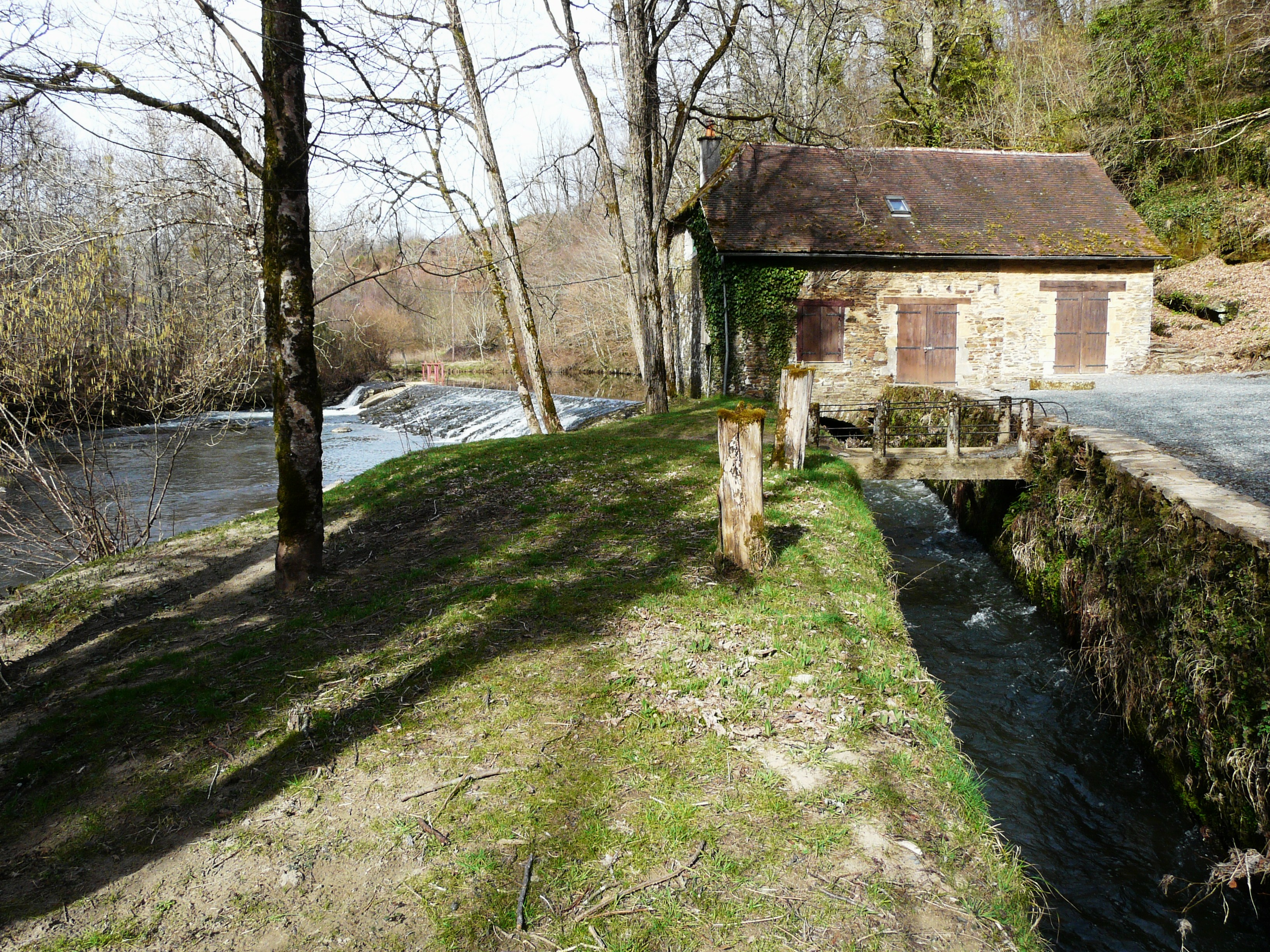
- Mill on the Auvézère

- Coat of arms
- Location of Beyssenac
- Location within France Location within Nouvelle-Aquitaine
- Coordinates: 45°24′18″N 1°17′13″E
- Country: France
- Region: Nouvelle-Aquitaine
- Department: Corrèze
- Arrondissement: Brive-la-Gaillarde
- Canton: Uzerche

Government
  - Mayor (2020–2026): Francis Comby
- Area^{1}: 18.30 km^{2} (7.07 sq mi)
- Elevation: 335 m (1,099 ft)
- Highest elevation: 436 m (1,430 ft)
- Lowest elevation: 253 m (830 ft)
- Population (2023): 370
  - Density: 20/km^{2} (52/sq mi)
- Time zone: UTC+01:00 (CET)
  - Summer (DST): UTC+02:00 (CEST)
- INSEE/Postal code: 19025 /19230
- ^{1} French Land Register data, which excludes lakes, ponds, glaciers > 1 km^{2} (0.386 sq mi or 247 acres) and river estuaries.

Beyssenac (French pronunciation: [bɛsnak]; Occitan: Baissenac) is a commune in the Corrèze department in central France.

== Population ==
Historical population
Year	Pop.	±% p.a.
1968	505	—
1975	451	−1.60%
1982	405	−1.53%
1990	382	−0.73%
1999	343	−1.19%
2007	361	+0.64%
2012	367	+0.33%
2017	368	+0.05%
2023	370	+0.09%
Source: INSEE

== Sights ==
It is home to a Romanesque church (12th century) and a monument commemorating a massacre by Nazi troops against the population of 16 February 1944.

== See also ==
- Communes of the Corrèze department
