= Les Trois-Saints =

- Commune
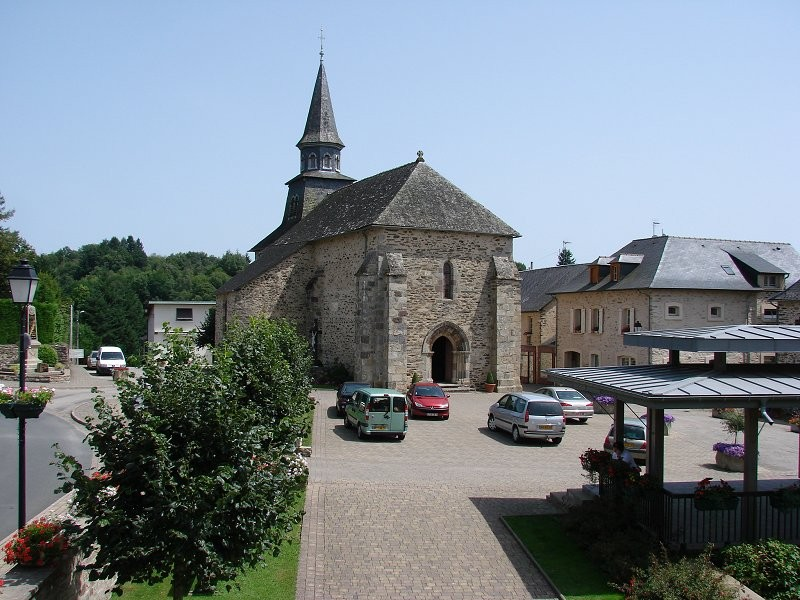
- The church in Saint-Ybard
- Location of Les Trois-Saints
- Location within France Location within Nouvelle-Aquitaine
- Coordinates: 45°26′56″N 1°31′21″E
- Country: France
- Region: Nouvelle-Aquitaine
- Department: Corrèze
- Arrondissement: Tulle
- Canton: Uzerche
- Intercommunality: Pays d'Uzerche
- Area^{1}: 63.2 km^{2} (24.4 sq mi)
- Highest elevation: 497 m (1,631 ft)
- Lowest elevation: 270 m (890 ft)
- Population (2023): 1,388
  - Density: 22.0/km^{2} (56.9/sq mi)
- Time zone: UTC+01:00 (CET)
  - Summer (DST): UTC+02:00 (CEST)
- INSEE/Postal code: 19248 /19140
- ^{1} French Land Register data, which excludes lakes, ponds, glaciers > 1 km^{2} (0.386 sq mi or 247 acres) and river estuaries.

Les Trois-Saints (pronounced [le tʁwɑ sɛ̃], lit. 'The Three Saints'; Occitan: Lo Tres Sants) is a commune in the Corrèze department in central France. It was formed on 1 January 2025, with the merger of Saint-Martin-Sepert, Saint-Pardoux-Corbier and Saint-Ybard.

== See also ==
- Communes of the Corrèze department
