= Masseret station =

Railway station in Masseret, France

Coordinates: 45°32′09″N 1°32′31″E

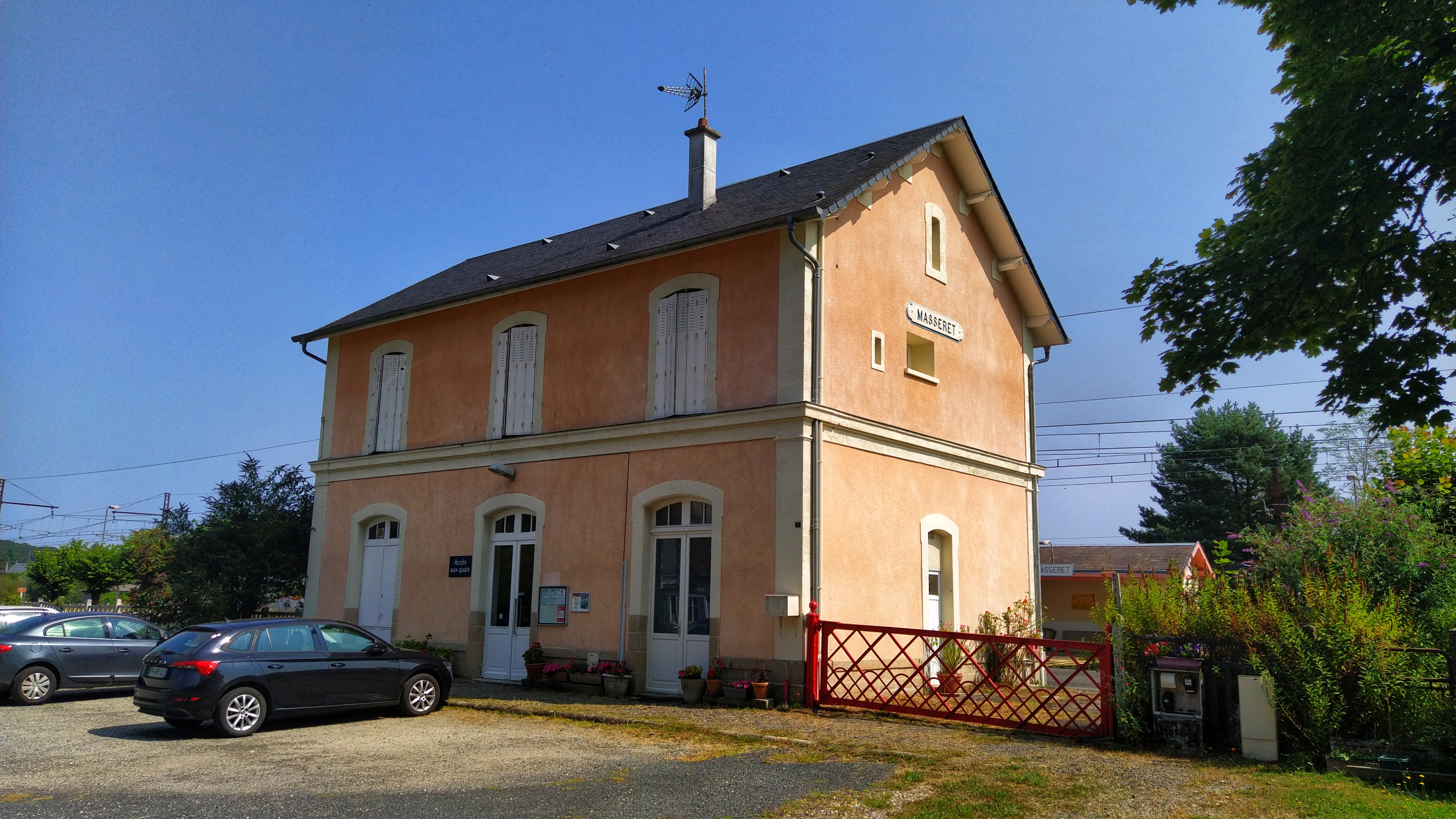
Masseret Station

Masseret is a railway station in Masseret, Nouvelle-Aquitaine, France. The station opened on 1 July 1893 and is located on the Orléans–Montauban railway line. The station is served by TER (local) services operated by SNCF.

== Train services ==
The following services currently call at Masseret:

- local service (TER Nouvelle-Aquitaine) Limoges - Uzerche - Brive-la-Gaillarde

| Preceding station | TER Nouvelle-Aquitaine | Following station |
|---|---|---|
| La Porcherie towards Limoges | 22 | Uzerche towards Brive-la-Gaillarde |
