= Saint-Julien-le-Vendômois =

- Commune
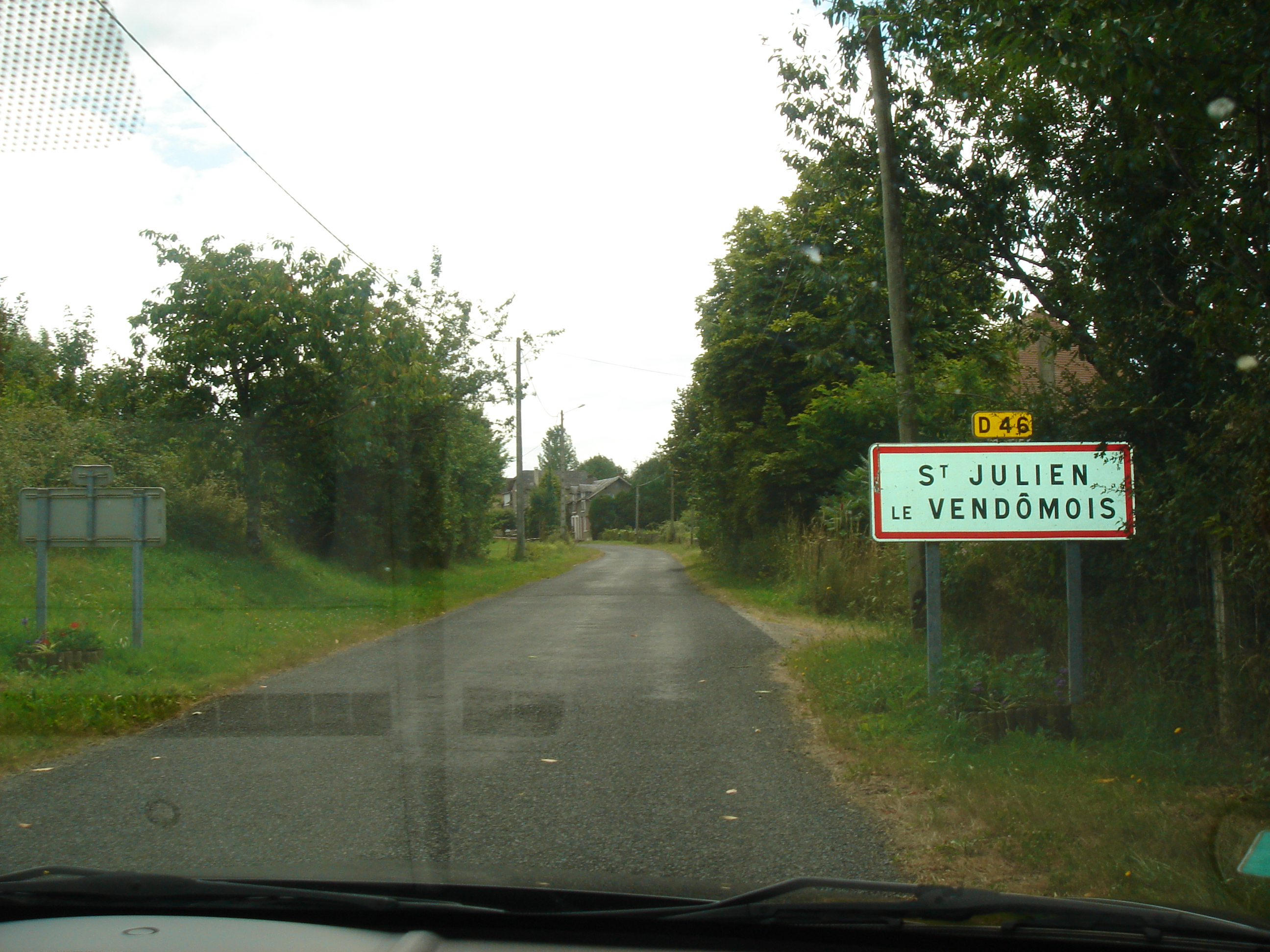
- The road into Saint-Julien-le-Vendômois

- Coat of arms
- Location of Saint-Julien-le-Vendômois
- Location within France Location within Nouvelle-Aquitaine
- Coordinates: 45°27′45″N 1°19′44″E
- Country: France
- Region: Nouvelle-Aquitaine
- Department: Corrèze
- Arrondissement: Brive-la-Gaillarde
- Canton: Uzerche
- Intercommunality: Pays de Lubersac-Pompadour

Government
  - Mayor (2020–2026): Jean-Pierre Nexon
- Area^{1}: 23.29 km^{2} (8.99 sq mi)
- Elevation: 360 m (1,180 ft)
- Highest elevation: 374 m (1,227 ft)
- Lowest elevation: 273 m (896 ft)
- Population (2023): 234
  - Density: 10.0/km^{2} (26.0/sq mi)
- Time zone: UTC+01:00 (CET)
  - Summer (DST): UTC+02:00 (CEST)
- INSEE/Postal code: 19216 /19210
- ^{1} French Land Register data, which excludes lakes, ponds, glaciers > 1 km^{2} (0.386 sq mi or 247 acres) and river estuaries.

Saint-Julien-le-Vendômois (French pronunciation: [sɛ̃ ʒyljɛ̃ lə vɑ̃domwa]; Limousin: Sent Julian (dau Vendonés)) is a commune in the Corrèze department in central France.

== Population ==
Historical population
Year	Pop.	±% p.a.
1968	547	—
1975	448	−2.81%
1982	375	−2.51%
1990	322	−1.89%
1999	308	−0.49%
2007	271	−1.59%
2012	258	−0.98%
2017	249	−0.71%
2023	234	−1.03%
Source: INSEE

== See also ==
- Communes of the Corrèze department
