= Jacques-Arsène d'Arsonval =

French physician and physicist (1851-1940)

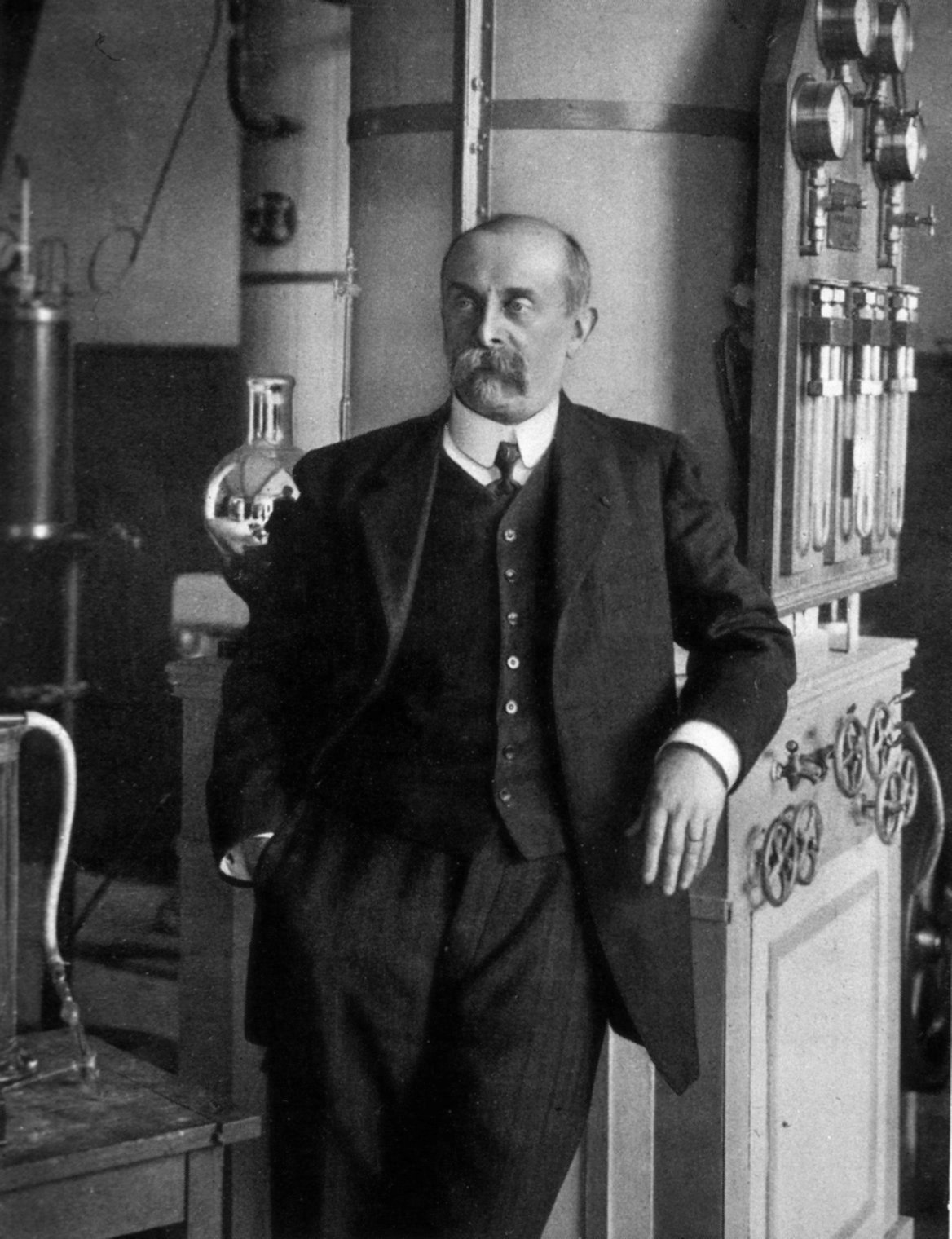
- Born: 8 June 1851; La Porcherie, France
- Died: 31 December 1940 (aged 89)
- Known for: d'Arsonval galvanometer
- Awards: Prix Montyon (1882)
- Scientific career
- Fields: Electrophysiology
- Workplaces: Collège de France

Jacques-Arsène d'Arsonval (8 June 1851 – 31 December 1940) was a French physician, physicist and inventor of the moving-coil d'Arsonval galvanometer and the thermocouple ammeter. D'Arsonval was an important contributor to the emerging field of electrophysiology, the study of the effects of electricity on biological organisms, in the nineteenth century.

== Life ==
D'Arsonval was born in the Château de la Borie, in La Porcherie, Haute Vienne, France. He studied medicine in Limoges and Paris and obtained his medical degree in 1877. From 1873 to 1878 he was assistant to Claude Bernard, one of the founders of experimental physiology. After Bernard’s death he assisted Charles-Édouard Brown-Séquard (1817-1894), giving his lectures, and when Brown-Séquard died in 1894 replaced him as professor at College de France.

Influenced by Bernard, d'Arsonval decided to devote his life to research. In 1892, he became director of the new laboratory of biophysics at the College de France and continued in that post until 1910. His main contributions were in electrophysiology. From 1889 d'Arsonval did the first research on the physiological effects of alternating current on the body. He discovered that currents with frequency over 5,000 Hz did not cause the muscular contractions and nerve stimulation effects of electric shock. Instead they seemed to have beneficial effects. He pioneered the therapeutic application of high frequency current to the body, founding the field of electrotherapy. He developed a spark-excited resonant circuit to generate currents of 0.5-2 MHz called "D'Arsonval currents" for therapy, which became known as "D'Arsonvalization". It was later used for diathermy.

In 1881, d'Arsonval proposed tapping the thermal energy of the ocean. D'Arsonval's student, Georges Claude, built the first ocean thermal energy conversion (OTEC) plant in Cuba in 1930.

He was awarded the Prix Montyon in 1882 and was appointed a Chevalier of the Legion of Honour in 1884, with Grand Cross in 1931. D'Arsonval crater on the Moon was named after him in 1976.

== See also ==
- Oudin coil
- Arthur Constantin Krebs
