= Benayes =

- Commune
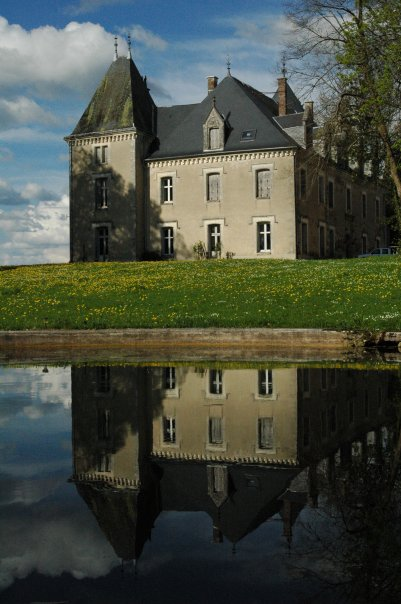
- The Château de Forsac

- Coat of arms
- Location of Benayes
- Location within France Location within Nouvelle-Aquitaine
- Coordinates: 45°31′15″N 1°28′18″E
- Country: France
- Region: Nouvelle-Aquitaine
- Department: Corrèze
- Arrondissement: Brive-la-Gaillarde
- Canton: Uzerche

Government
  - Mayor (2020–2026): Jean-Louis Maury
- Area^{1}: 23.12 km^{2} (8.93 sq mi)
- Elevation: 460 m (1,510 ft)
- Highest elevation: 479 m (1,572 ft)
- Lowest elevation: 333 m (1,093 ft)
- Population (2023): 224
  - Density: 9.69/km^{2} (25.1/sq mi)
- Time zone: UTC+01:00 (CET)
  - Summer (DST): UTC+02:00 (CEST)
- INSEE/Postal code: 19022 /19510
- ^{1} French Land Register data, which excludes lakes, ponds, glaciers > 1 km^{2} (0.386 sq mi or 247 acres) and river estuaries.

Benayes is a commune of the Corrèze department in central France.

== Population ==
Historical population
Year	Pop.	±% p.a.
1968	472	—
1975	412	−1.92%
1982	365	−1.72%
1990	310	−2.02%
1999	288	−0.81%
2007	272	−0.71%
2012	254	−1.36%
2017	228	−2.14%
2023	224	−0.29%
Source: INSEE

== See also ==
- Communes of the Corrèze department
