= Masseret =

- Commune
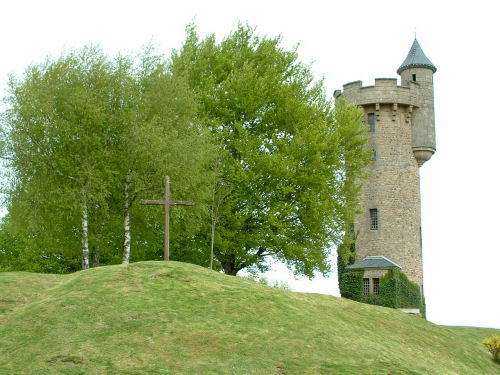
- The Tour de Masseret

- Coat of arms
- Location of Masseret
- Location within France Location within Nouvelle-Aquitaine
- Coordinates: 45°32′38″N 1°31′12″E
- Country: France
- Region: Nouvelle-Aquitaine
- Department: Corrèze
- Arrondissement: Tulle
- Canton: Uzerche
- Intercommunality: Pays d'Uzerche

Government
  - Mayor (2020–2026): Bernard Roux
- Area^{1}: 13.5 km^{2} (5.2 sq mi)
- Highest elevation: 520 m (1,710 ft)
- Lowest elevation: 389 m (1,276 ft)
- Population (2023): 678
  - Density: 50.2/km^{2} (130/sq mi)
- Time zone: UTC+01:00 (CET)
  - Summer (DST): UTC+02:00 (CEST)
- INSEE/Postal code: 19129 /19510
- ^{1} French Land Register data, which excludes lakes, ponds, glaciers > 1 km^{2} (0.386 sq mi or 247 acres) and river estuaries.

Masseret is a commune in the Corrèze department in central France. Masseret station has rail connections to Brive-la-Gaillarde, Uzerche and Limoges.

== Population ==
Historical population
Year	Pop.	±% p.a.
1968	813	—
1975	742	−1.30%
1982	731	−0.21%
1990	669	−1.10%
1999	608	−1.06%
2007	666	+1.15%
2012	678	+0.36%
2017	676	−0.06%
2023	678	+0.05%
Source: INSEE

== See also ==
- Communes of the Corrèze department
