= Montgibaud =

- Commune
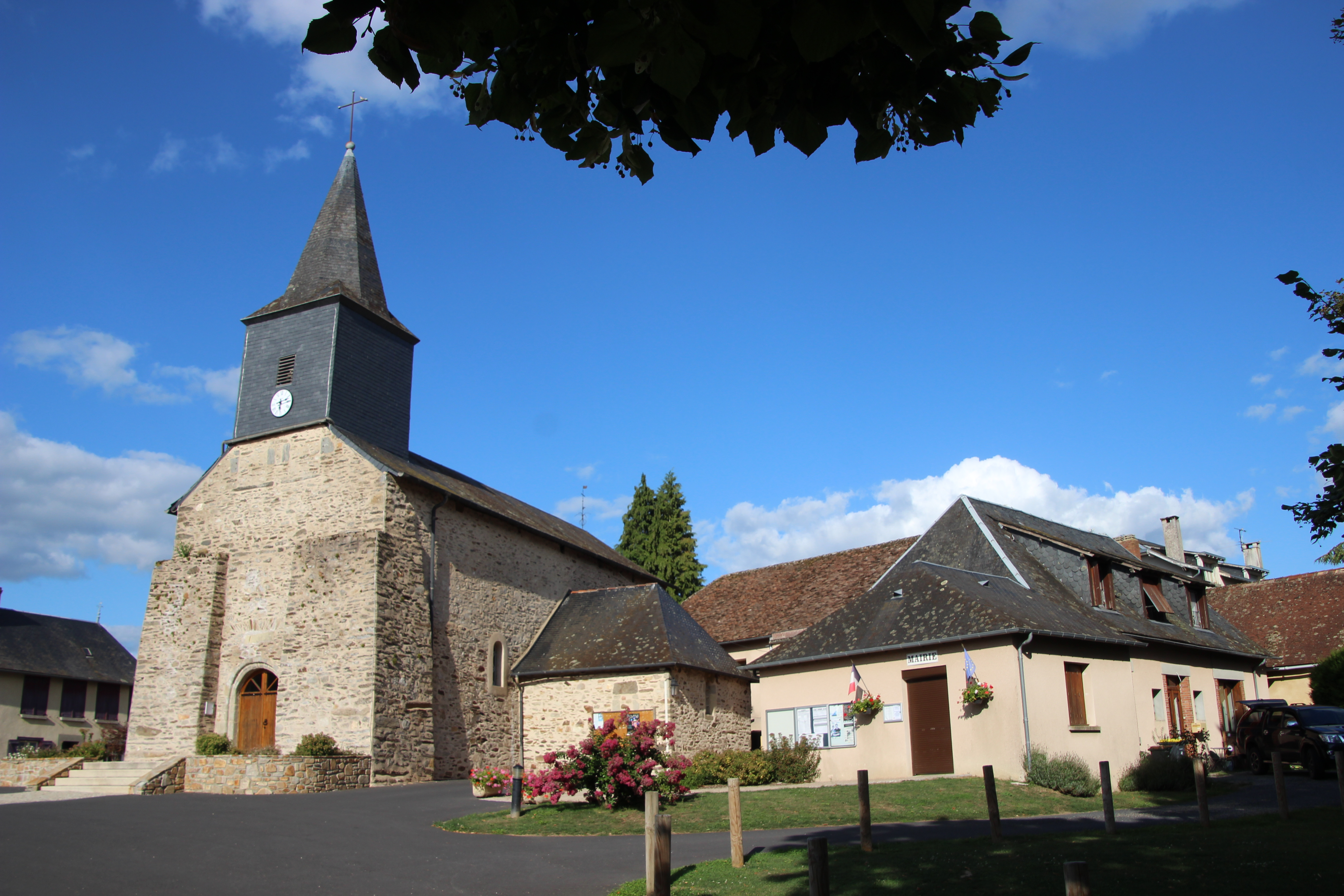
- Town hall

- Coat of arms
- Location of Montgibaud
- Location within France Location within Nouvelle-Aquitaine
- Coordinates: 45°31′11″N 1°25′24″E
- Country: France
- Region: Nouvelle-Aquitaine
- Department: Corrèze
- Arrondissement: Brive-la-Gaillarde
- Canton: Uzerche

Government
  - Mayor (2020–2026): Alain Marsat
- Area^{1}: 13.99 km^{2} (5.40 sq mi)
- Elevation: 450 m (1,480 ft)
- Highest elevation: 474 m (1,555 ft)
- Lowest elevation: 324 m (1,063 ft)
- Population (2023): 251
  - Density: 17.9/km^{2} (46.5/sq mi)
- Time zone: UTC+01:00 (CET)
  - Summer (DST): UTC+02:00 (CEST)
- INSEE/Postal code: 19144 /19210
- ^{1} French Land Register data, which excludes lakes, ponds, glaciers > 1 km^{2} (0.386 sq mi or 247 acres) and river estuaries.

Montgibaud (French pronunciation: [mɔ̃ʒibo]) is a commune in the Corrèze department in central France.

== Population ==
Historical population
Year	Pop.	±% p.a.
1968	324	—
1975	281	−2.01%
1982	217	−3.62%
1990	216	−0.06%
1999	241	+1.22%
2007	231	−0.53%
2012	234	+0.26%
2017	239	+0.42%
2023	251	+0.82%
Source: INSEE

== See also ==
- Communes of the Corrèze department
