= La Porcherie station =

Railway station in La Porcherie, France

Coordinates: 45°34′27″N 1°32′18″E

La Porcherie is a railway station in La Porcherie, Nouvelle-Aquitaine, France. The station is located on the Orléans–Montauban railway line. The station is served by TER (local) services operated by SNCF.

== Train services ==
The following services currently call at La Porcherie:

- local service (TER Nouvelle-Aquitaine) Limoges - Uzerche - Brive-la-Gaillarde

Preceding station	TER Nouvelle-Aquitaine	Following station
Saint-Germain-les-Belles towards Limoges	22	Masseret towards Brive-la-Gaillarde
