= Eyburie =

- Commune
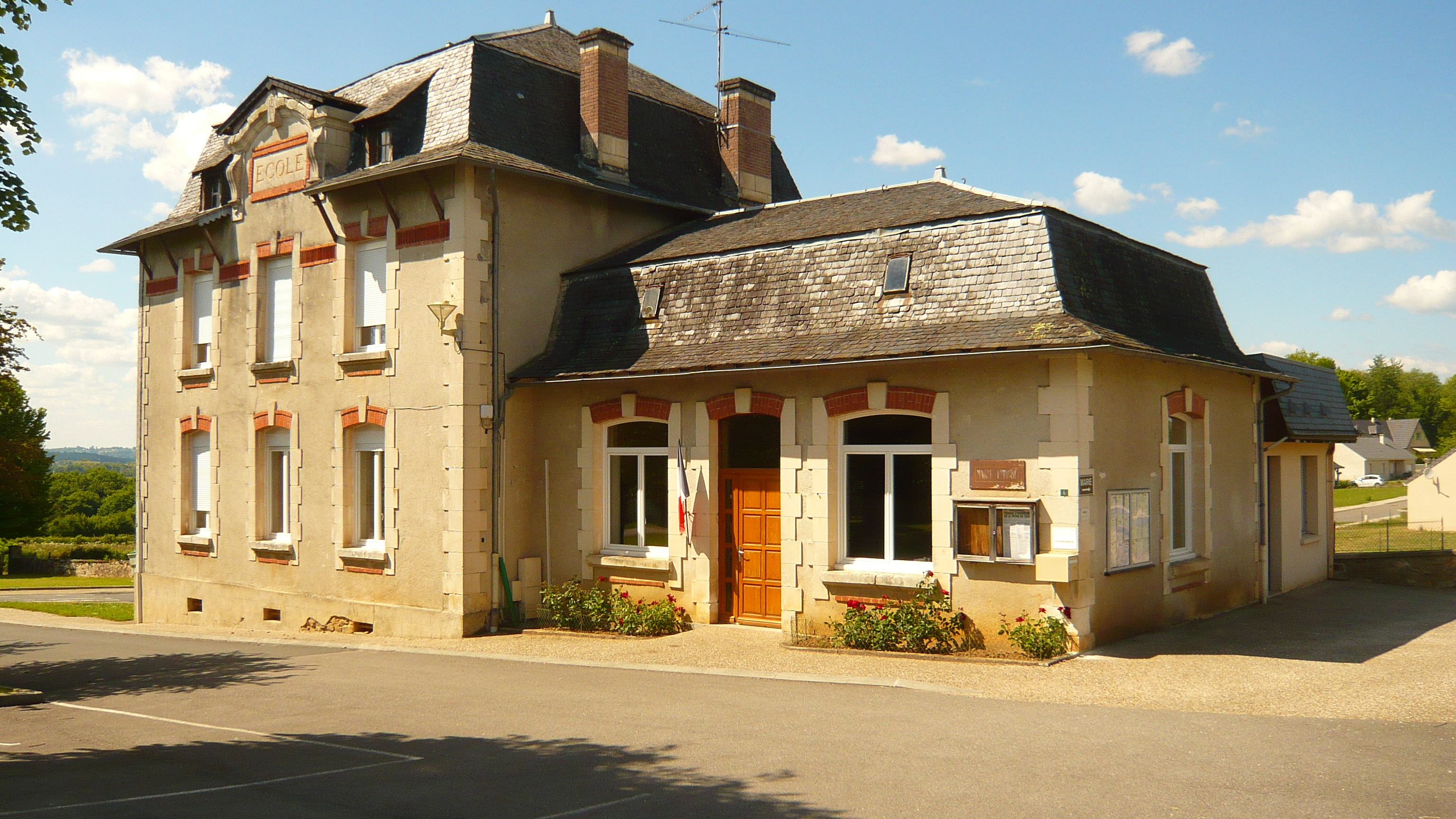
- Town hall

- Coat of arms
- Location of Eyburie
- Location within France Location within Nouvelle-Aquitaine
- Coordinates: 45°27′38″N 1°38′11″E
- Country: France
- Region: Nouvelle-Aquitaine
- Department: Corrèze
- Arrondissement: Tulle
- Canton: Uzerche
- Intercommunality: Pays d'Uzerche

Government
  - Mayor (2022–2026): Nathalie Chassagne
- Area^{1}: 29.14 km^{2} (11.25 sq mi)
- Elevation: 440 m (1,440 ft)
- Highest elevation: 452 m (1,483 ft)
- Lowest elevation: 296 m (971 ft)
- Population (2023): 486
  - Density: 16.7/km^{2} (43.2/sq mi)
- Time zone: UTC+01:00 (CET)
  - Summer (DST): UTC+02:00 (CEST)
- INSEE/Postal code: 19079 /19140
- ^{1} French Land Register data, which excludes lakes, ponds, glaciers > 1 km^{2} (0.386 sq mi or 247 acres) and river estuaries.

Eyburie (French pronunciation: [ɛbyʁi]; Occitan: Esburia) is a commune in the Corrèze department in central France.

== Population ==
Historical population
Year	Pop.	±% p.a.
1968	629	—
1975	570	−1.40%
1982	539	−0.80%
1990	528	−0.26%
1999	499	−0.63%
2007	489	−0.25%
2012	459	−1.26%
2017	497	+1.60%
2023	486	−0.37%
Source: INSEE

== See also ==
- Communes of the Corrèze department
