= Salon-la-Tour =

- Commune
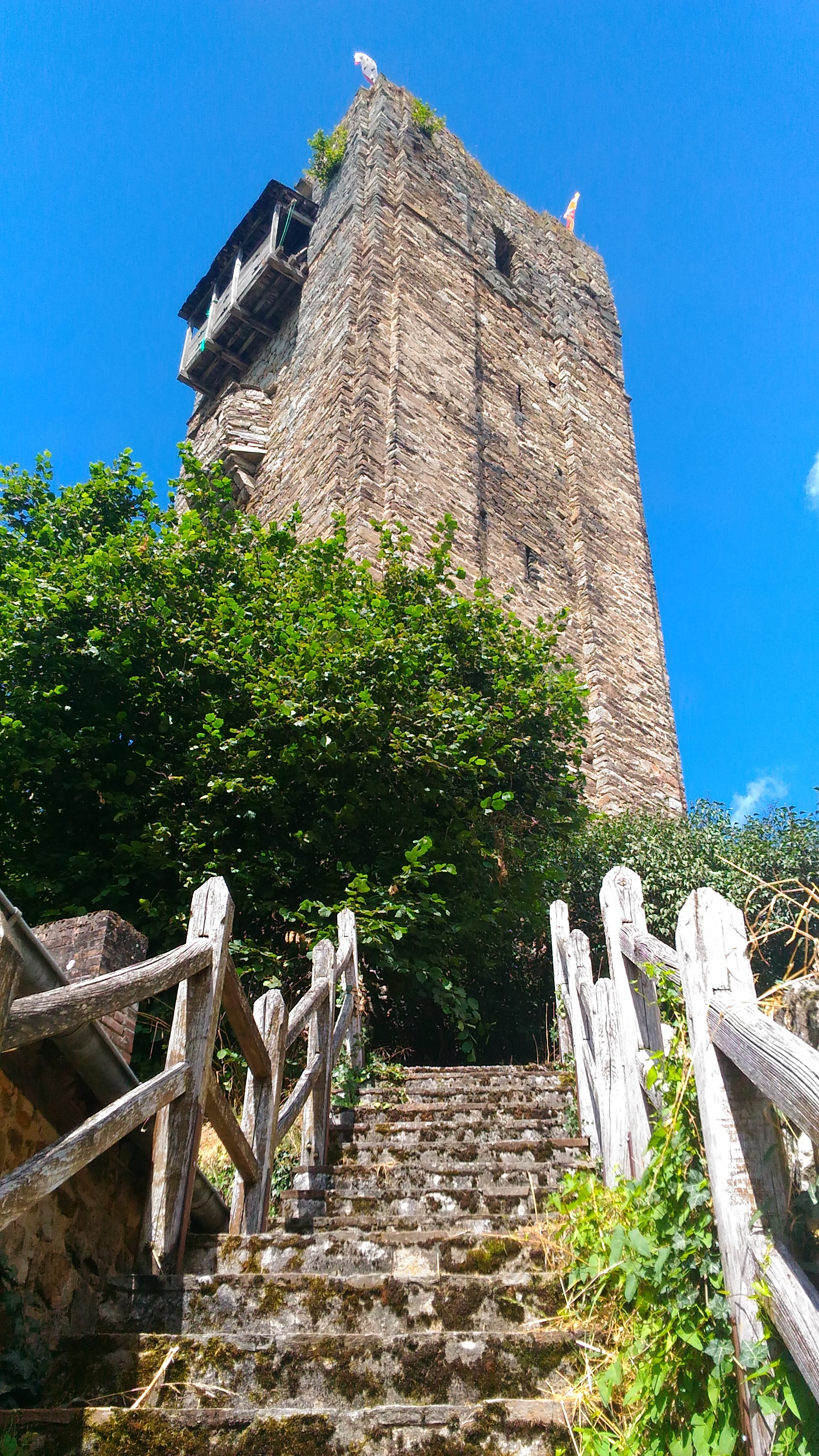

- Coat of arms
- Location of Salon-la-Tour
- Location within France Location within Nouvelle-Aquitaine
- Coordinates: 45°30′20″N 1°32′21″E
- Country: France
- Region: Nouvelle-Aquitaine
- Department: Corrèze
- Arrondissement: Tulle
- Canton: Uzerche
- Intercommunality: Pays d'Uzerche

Government
  - Mayor (2020–2026): Jean-Claude Chauffour
- Area^{1}: 43.01 km^{2} (16.61 sq mi)
- Elevation: 350 m (1,150 ft)
- Highest elevation: 492 m (1,614 ft)
- Lowest elevation: 335 m (1,099 ft)
- Population (2023): 681
  - Density: 15.8/km^{2} (41.0/sq mi)
- Time zone: UTC+01:00 (CET)
  - Summer (DST): UTC+02:00 (CEST)
- INSEE/Postal code: 19250 /19510
- ^{1} French Land Register data, which excludes lakes, ponds, glaciers > 1 km^{2} (0.386 sq mi or 247 acres) and river estuaries.

Salon-la-Tour (French pronunciation: [salɔ̃ la tuʁ]; Occitan: Celom) is a commune in the Corrèze department in central France.

Violette Szabo, a 22-year-old British agent who was parachuted a second time into France, on 7 June 1944 (where she was to try to help obstruct the movement of German SS units from the south of France to Normandy), was captured near Salon-la-Tour.

== Population ==
Historical population
Year	Pop.	±% p.a.
1968	1,018	—
1975	926	−1.34%
1982	798	−2.10%
1990	729	−1.12%
1999	721	−0.12%
2007	705	−0.28%
2012	675	−0.87%
2017	658	−0.51%
2023	681	+0.57%
Source: INSEE

== Notable residents ==
- Varg Vikernes

== See also ==
- Communes of the Corrèze department
