= Saint-Jal =

- Commune
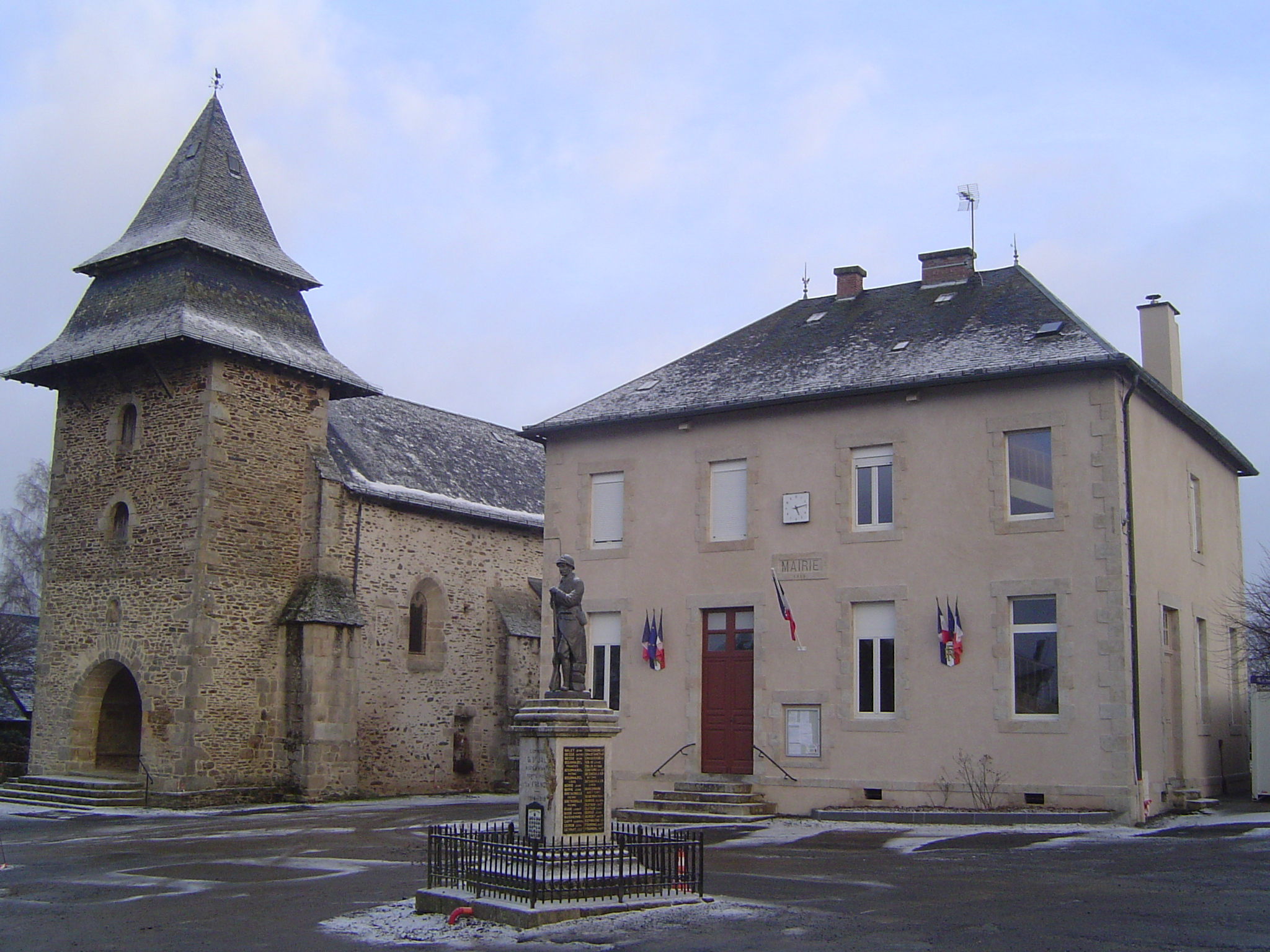
- The church and the town hall

- Coat of arms
- Location of Saint-Jal
- Location within France Location within Nouvelle-Aquitaine
- Coordinates: 45°23′51″N 1°38′38″E
- Country: France
- Region: Nouvelle-Aquitaine
- Department: Corrèze
- Arrondissement: Tulle
- Canton: Seilhac-Monédières
- Intercommunality: CA Tulle Agglo

Government
  - Mayor (2020–2026): Jean-Jacques Lauga
- Area^{1}: 26.55 km^{2} (10.25 sq mi)
- Elevation: 430 m (1,410 ft)
- Highest elevation: 503 m (1,650 ft)
- Lowest elevation: 332 m (1,089 ft)
- Population (2023): 594
  - Density: 22.4/km^{2} (57.9/sq mi)
- Time zone: UTC+01:00 (CET)
  - Summer (DST): UTC+02:00 (CEST)
- INSEE/Postal code: 19213 /19700
- ^{1} French Land Register data, which excludes lakes, ponds, glaciers > 1 km^{2} (0.386 sq mi or 247 acres) and river estuaries.

Saint-Jal (French pronunciation: [sɛ̃ ʒal]; Occitan: Sent Jal) is a commune in the Corrèze department in central France.

== Population ==
Historical population
Year	Pop.	±% p.a.
1968	746	—
1975	615	−2.72%
1982	617	+0.05%
1990	616	−0.02%
1999	597	−0.35%
2007	637	+0.81%
2012	655	+0.56%
2017	629	−0.81%
2023	594	−0.95%
Source: INSEE

== See also ==
- Communes of the Corrèze department
