= Condat-sur-Ganaveix =

- Commune
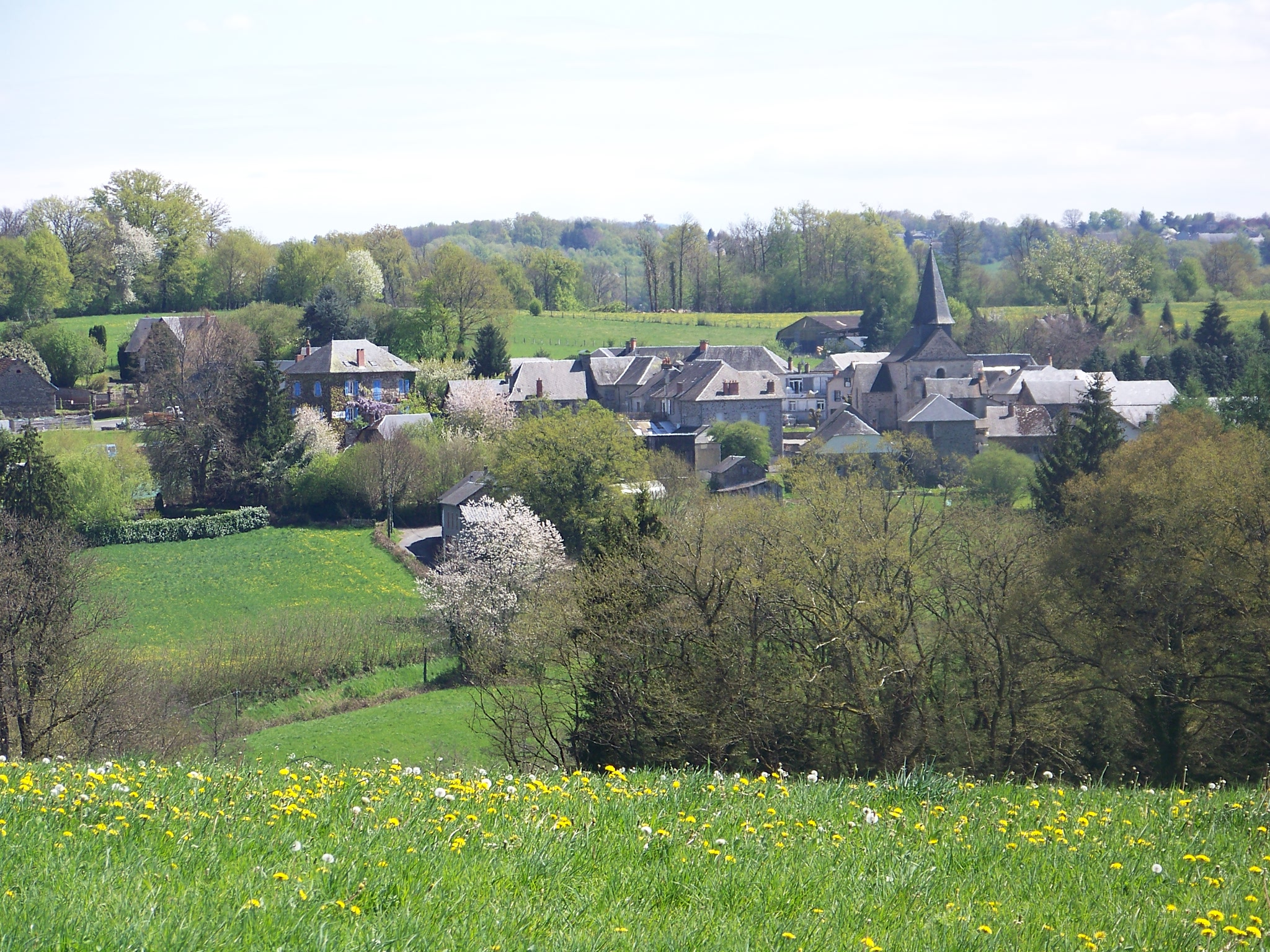
- A general view of Condat-sur-Ganaveix

- Coat of arms
- Location of Condat-sur-Ganaveix
- Location within France Location within Nouvelle-Aquitaine
- Coordinates: 45°28′06″N 1°35′41″E
- Country: France
- Region: Nouvelle-Aquitaine
- Department: Corrèze
- Arrondissement: Tulle
- Canton: Uzerche
- Intercommunality: Pays d'Uzerche

Government
  - Mayor (2020–2026): Michel Plazanet
- Area^{1}: 37.52 km^{2} (14.49 sq mi)
- Elevation: 350 m (1,150 ft)
- Highest elevation: 470 m (1,540 ft)
- Lowest elevation: 296 m (971 ft)
- Population (2023): 643
  - Density: 17.1/km^{2} (44.4/sq mi)
- Time zone: UTC+01:00 (CET)
  - Summer (DST): UTC+02:00 (CEST)
- INSEE/Postal code: 19060 /19140
- ^{1} French Land Register data, which excludes lakes, ponds, glaciers > 1 km^{2} (0.386 sq mi or 247 acres) and river estuaries.

Condat-sur-Ganaveix (Occitan: Condat de Ganavés) is a commune in the Corrèze department in central France.

== Population ==
Historical population
Year	Pop.	±% p.a.
1968	922	—
1975	815	−1.75%
1982	726	−1.64%
1990	678	−0.85%
1999	631	−0.80%
2007	657	+0.51%
2012	641	−0.49%
2017	672	+0.95%
2023	643	−0.73%
Source: INSEE

== See also ==
- Communes of the Corrèze department
