= Uzerche station =

Railway station in Uzerche, France

Coordinates: 45°26′28″N 1°34′14″E

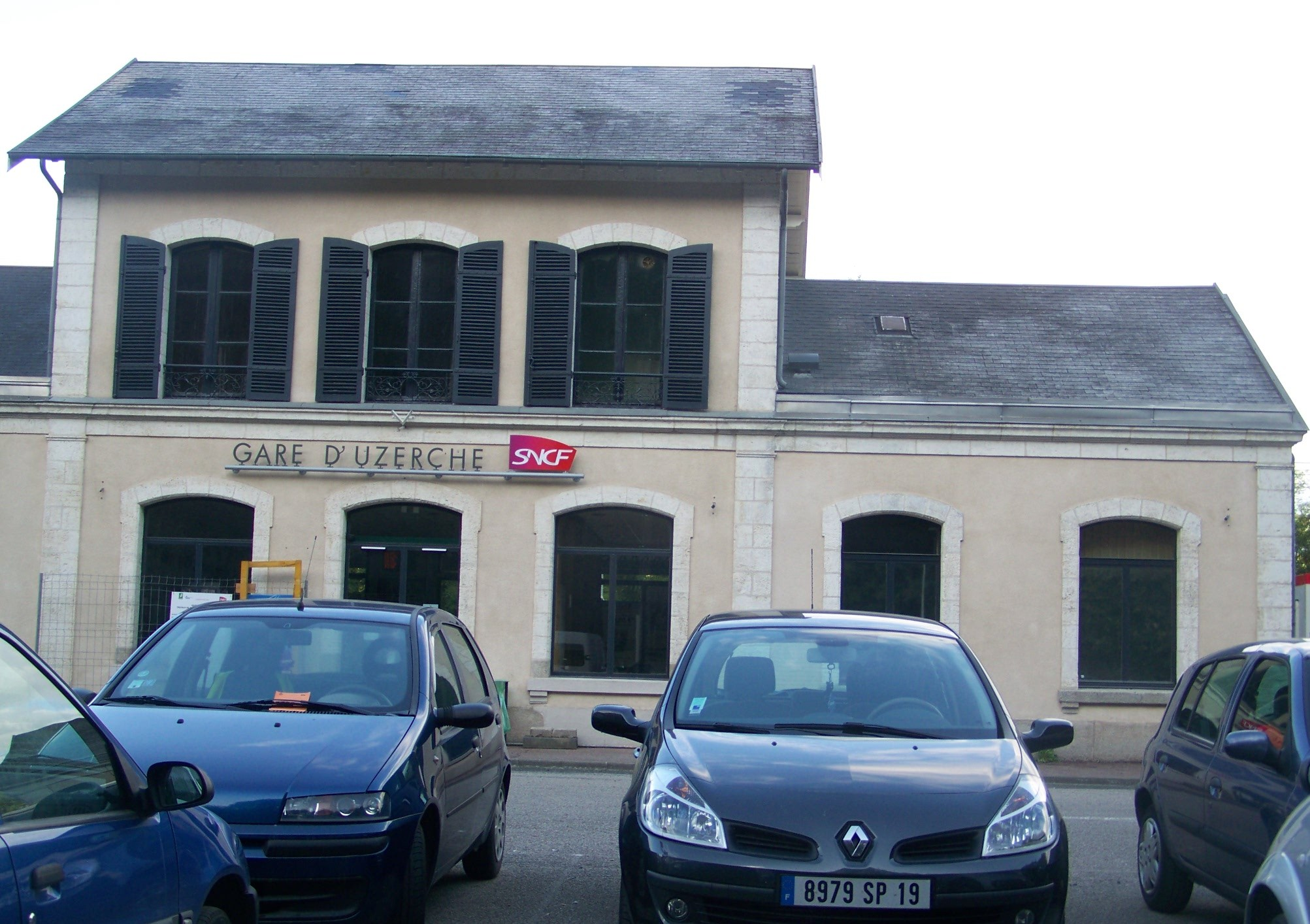
City of Uzerche railway station, in the department of Corrèze, France.

Uzerche is a railway station in Uzerche, Nouvelle-Aquitaine, France. The station is located on the Orléans–Montauban railway line. The station is served by the Intercités (long distance) and TER (local) services.

== Train services ==
The following services currently call at Uzerche:

- intercity services (Intercités) Paris - Vierzon - Limoges - Toulouse
- local service (TER Nouvelle-Aquitaine) Limoges - Uzerche - Brive-la-Gaillarde

Preceding station	SNCF	Following station
Limoges towards Paris-Austerlitz	Intercités	Brive-la-Gaillarde towards Toulouse
Preceding station	TER Nouvelle-Aquitaine	Following station
Masseret towards Limoges	22	Vigeois towards Brive-la-Gaillarde
