= Canton of Uzerche =

Canton in South-Central France

Coordinates: 45.42°N 1.56°E

The canton of Uzerche is an administrative division of the Corrèze department, south-central France. Its borders were modified at the French canton reorganisation which came into effect in March 2015. Its seat is in Uzerche.

It consists of the following communes:

1. Arnac-Pompadour
2. Benayes
3. Beyssac
4. Beyssenac
5. Condat-sur-Ganaveix
6. Espartignac
7. Eyburie
8. Lamongerie
9. Lubersac
10. Masseret
11. Meilhards
12. Montgibaud
13. Saint-Éloy-les-Tuileries
14. Saint-Julien-le-Vendômois
15. Saint-Sornin-Lavolps
16. Salon-la-Tour
17. Ségur-le-Château
18. Les Trois-Saints
19. Uzerche
