= Chamboulive =

- Commune
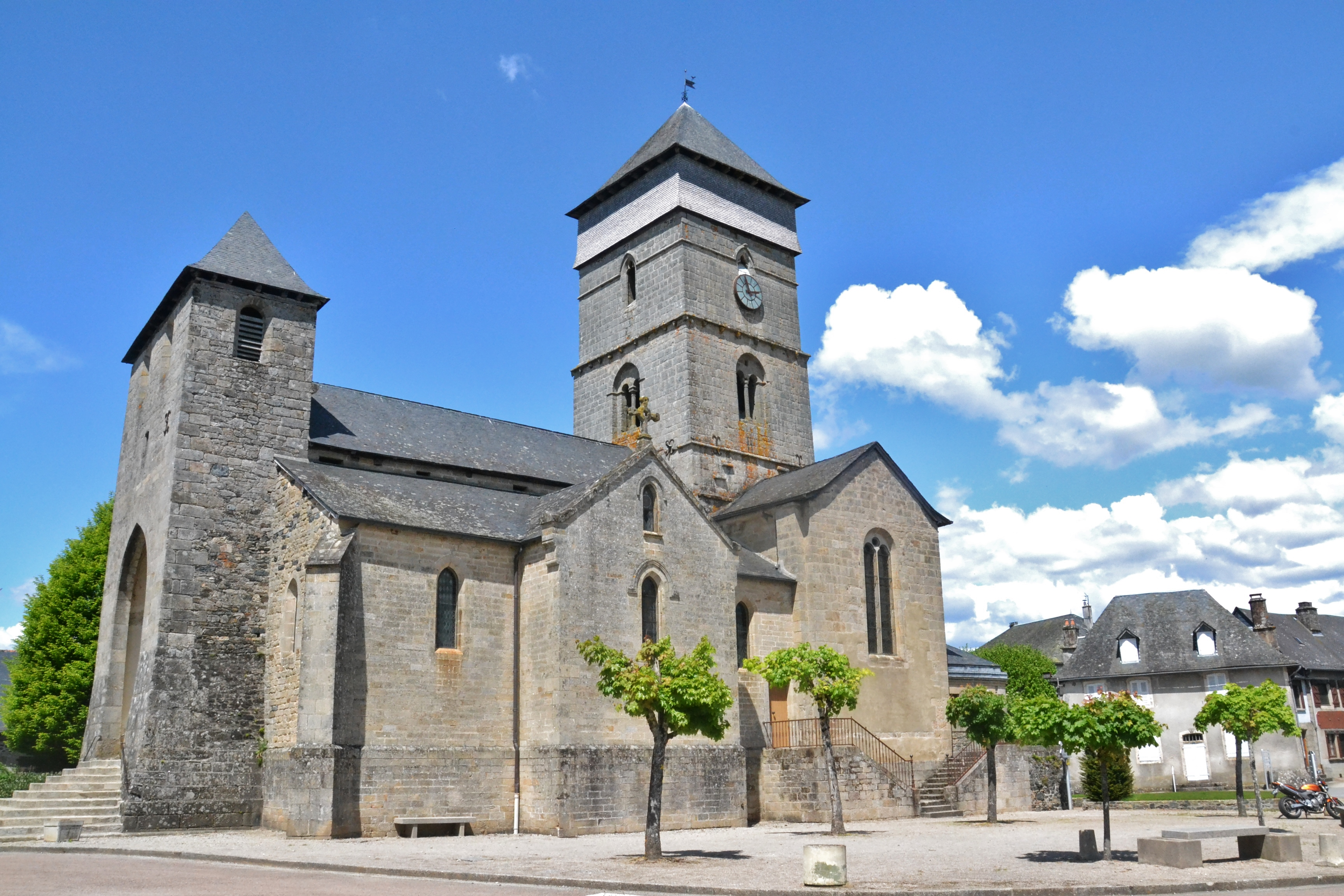
- The church of Saint-Côme and Saint-Damien

- Coat of arms
- Location of Chamboulive
- Location within France Location within Nouvelle-Aquitaine
- Coordinates: 45°25′58″N 1°42′19″E
- Country: France
- Region: Nouvelle-Aquitaine
- Department: Corrèze
- Arrondissement: Tulle
- Canton: Seilhac-Monédières
- Intercommunality: CA Tulle Agglo

Government
  - Mayor (2020–2026): Betty Dessine
- Area^{1}: 46.8 km^{2} (18.1 sq mi)
- Elevation: 430 m (1,410 ft)
- Highest elevation: 530 m (1,740 ft)
- Lowest elevation: 312 m (1,024 ft)
- Population (2023): 1,155
  - Density: 24.7/km^{2} (63.9/sq mi)
- Time zone: UTC+01:00 (CET)
  - Summer (DST): UTC+02:00 (CEST)
- INSEE/Postal code: 19037 /19450
- ^{1} French Land Register data, which excludes lakes, ponds, glaciers > 1 km^{2} (0.386 sq mi or 247 acres) and river estuaries.

Chamboulive (French pronunciation: [ʃɑ̃buliv]; Occitan: Chamboliva) is a commune in the Corrèze department in central France.

== Geography ==
=== Location ===
Chamboulive occupies a plateau bordered to the northwest by the Vézère river and notched by several streams, including the Madrange and the Rujoux, tributaries of the Vézère. The municipality covers 4,679 ha with a maximum elevation of 529 m in the Puy-Grand, while on the church square the height is 430 m.

== Population ==
Historical population
Year	Pop.	±% p.a.
1968	1,411	—
1975	1,281	−1.37%
1982	1,210	−0.81%
1990	1,190	−0.21%
1999	1,133	−0.54%
2007	1,294	+1.67%
2012	1,170	−1.99%
2017	1,209	+0.66%
2023	1,155	−0.76%
Source: INSEE

== History ==
The origin of the name is uncertain. One can, of course, cite the small people of the Camboleutheri, mentioned by Julius Caesar, but only the first part of the word appears legible with the term camb- i.e. the curve. This could lead to evoking a hilly country with multiple sources and fertile land... With the exception of the well-dilapidated oppidum of the Puy-Chalard, few archaeological finds (some polished stone objects, some sites occupied at the beginning of our era), attest to an ancient occupation of the soil.

In the early Middle Ages, Chamboulive is the seat of a pagus minor, a small pays of the Limousin, a very old territorial division of the City of Lémovices, a vicariate, administrative and judicial district and a parish under the term of Saints Como and Damien, Syrian doctors.

From the 11th century, we know of the existence of special lords, the Comptors. The lordship then belongs to the Comborn's, their successors and, before 1789, to the Lastic-Saint-Jal. In the 14th century, Dom Jean Birelle, head of the Carthusian Order of monks, from Chamboulive, was first proposed as pope on the death of Pope Clement VI for the papal throne. He declined and the new pope was named Innocent VI.

At the end of the old regime, the parish reported to the Bailiwick of Uzerche (on appeal from the Parliament of Bordeaux), the election of Brive-la-Gaillarde and the main part of Limoges.

In 1790, Chamboulive, has around 2,500 inhabitants, became the commune and capital of a canton which is ended in 1801. Since then, it has been attached to the canton of Seilhac, in Corrèze.

The new municipality is endowed with arms (a chestnut topped by the head of France). Disturbances erupt (opening of ponds in 1791, looting of castles in 1792).

In 1792, a club of Friends of the Constitution is created: It remains very active and vigilant. This period was dominated by the figure of Pierre Rivière (1749-1806) who replaced Bigourie du Chambon at the National Convention.

In the nineteenth century, the municipality remained very populous with a maximum of 3,103 inhabitants in 1846. It has 2,833 in 1896, 2,057 in 1946 and 1,133 in 1999.

In 1831, the cemetery chapel was transformed into a town hall and a school.

In 1848, the French Revolution of 1848 was marked by disturbances requiring the intervention of soldiers of the 10th Light, Tulle. Under the French Third Republic, a great effort is being made to develop teaching. An imposing school and a modern town hall are built. Hamlet schools were created in Chalaux, Vernéjoux and Le Puy-Grand.

In July 1904, the narrow track train connected Chamboulive to Treignac, Seilhac, Tulle and Uzerche, dubbed le Tacot.

But Chamboulive paid a heavy tribute to the field of honour by losing more than 150 soldiers during the First World War. During World War II, there were 20 dead, missing, deported, one shot. Two Chamboulivois were killed during the Algerian War.

== Places and monuments ==
- Church of Saint-Como-et-Saint-Damien de Chamboulive
- The site of the Chapelle du Puy Saint Damien, highest point in Chamboulive. The Orientation table on the site shows a map of the horizon.

At the entrance of the site is the sculpture of Marc Duquesnoy, made in 2010 on the occasion of Chamboul'art.

== Notable people ==
- Louis de Lang, painter born in Chamboulive on 5 June 1873, died in 1933.
- André Lagrafeuille and Henri Bourg, a resistance member shot in Tulle on 2 April 1944, born in Chamboulive.

== Twinning ==
- Gozée - Belgium

== See also ==
- Communes of the Corrèze department
