= Marc Held =

French architect, photographer and interior designer (1932–2026)

- Born: Marcel Held; 16 August 1932; Paris, France
- Died: 27 July 2026 (aged 93); Volos, Greece
- Occupations: Architect; Photographer; Interior designer

Marcel "Marc" Held (French: [maʁsˈɛl "mˈaʁk" hˈɛld]; 16 August 1932 – 27 July 2026) was a French architect, photographer, and interior designer.

== Life and career ==
Born in Paris on 16 August 1932, Held grew up in a family from Central European Jewish communities, with a Polish mother and a Hungarian father. His atheist, Marxist parents met in France and settled in Bagnolet, where he grew up in a world steeped in communist ideals. In 1942, during the German occupation, he was hidden by a Protestant pastor before fleeing Paris with his mother to find refuge in the Zone libre in Chanteix. He was taken in by the family of Marie and Jean Mirat, who lived in Saint-Clément. In 1944, his father joined the French Resistance and introduced it to him. Following the Liberation of Paris, he pursued humanist photography, having previously worked as a theater facilitator and physical education teacher. He subsequently developed a passion for design and architecture.

In 1960, Held founded the architecture and design firm Archiforme. That same year, he signed an exclusivity deal with the manufacturer Créateurs & Industriels, led by Didier Grumbach and Andrée Putman. In 1983, he designed the interiors for the presidential apartment at the request of François Mitterrand. However, he grew discontented with his career trajectory and moved to Greece in 1989, where he went on to design villas on the island of Skopelos.

Marc Held died in Volos on 27 July 2026, at the age of 93.

== Notable creations ==
- Culbuto (armchair, on display at the Musée des Arts Décoratifs, Paris)
- Bed with integrated nightstands and bedside lamps (Musée des Arts Décoratifs, Paris)
- Tea set, teapot, and cup (Musée national Adrien-Dubouché)

== Publications ==
- Marc Held 10 ans de recherche (1973)
- Denis Rivière (1980)
- Lettres à Gerry, Les architectes nous mènent-ils en bateau ? (1986)
- Montpellier, la Lande (1986)
- Maisons de Skopelos. Précis d’architecture vernaculaire (1994)
- Marc Held, du design à l’architecture (2009)
- Marc Held, 50 ans de design (2014)
- Rêvons d'une autre ville ! (2022)
- Samba Dia. L’école du Centre de la Terre (2024)
