= Affieux =

- Commune
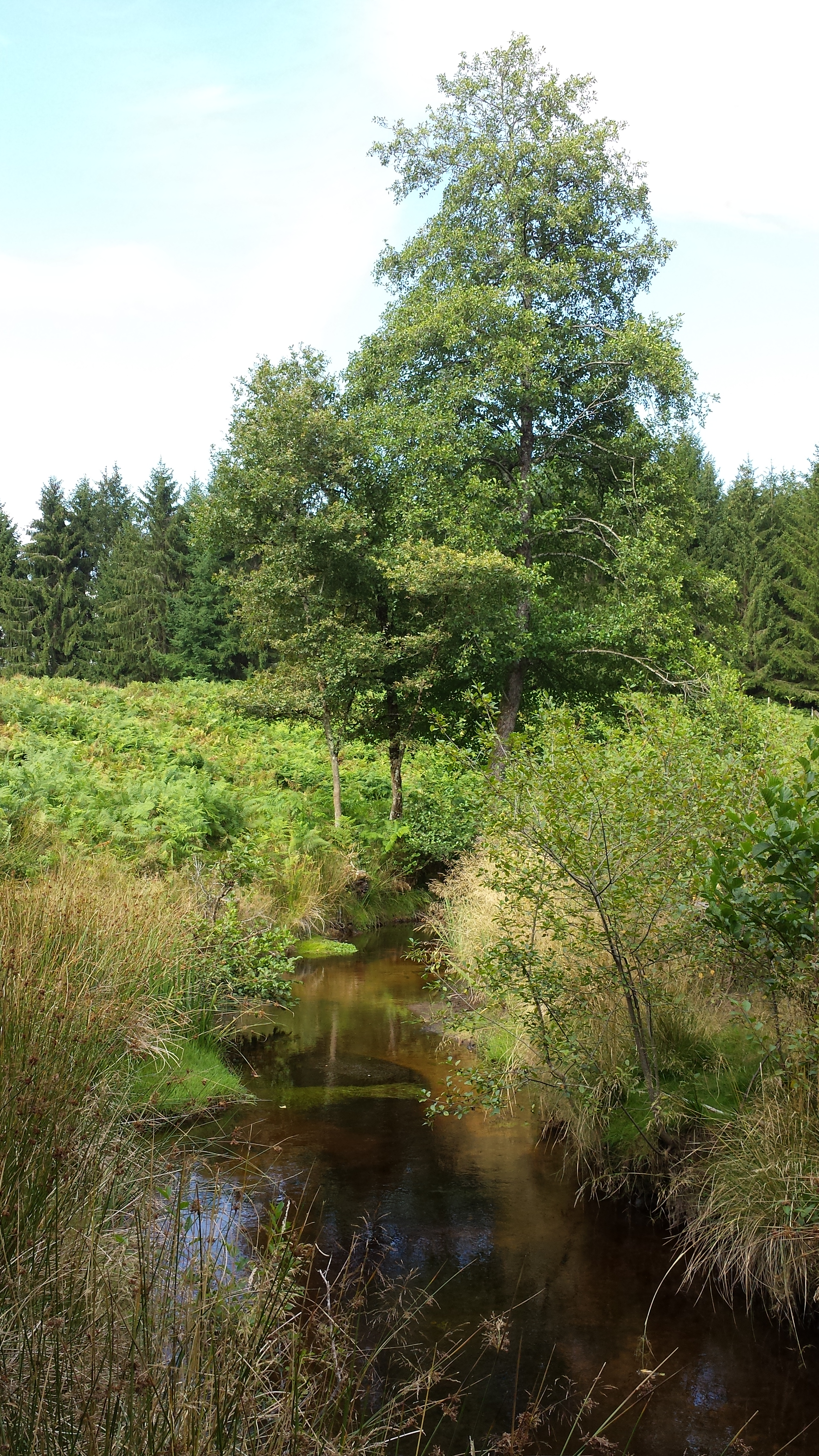
- The stream of Boulou

- Coat of arms
- Location of Affieux
- Location within France Location within Nouvelle-Aquitaine
- Coordinates: 45°31′07″N 1°46′05″E
- Country: France
- Region: Nouvelle-Aquitaine
- Department: Corrèze
- Arrondissement: Tulle
- Canton: Seilhac-Monédières
- Intercommunality: Vézère-Monédières-Millesources

Government
  - Mayor (2020–2026): Didier Jarrige
- Area^{1}: 30.19 km^{2} (11.66 sq mi)
- Elevation: 520 m (1,710 ft)
- Highest elevation: 772 m (2,533 ft)
- Lowest elevation: 333 m (1,093 ft)
- Population (2023): 385
  - Density: 12.8/km^{2} (33.0/sq mi)
- Time zone: UTC+01:00 (CET)
  - Summer (DST): UTC+02:00 (CEST)
- INSEE/Postal code: 19001 /19260
- ^{1} French Land Register data, which excludes lakes, ponds, glaciers > 1 km^{2} (0.386 sq mi or 247 acres) and river estuaries.

Affieux (French pronunciation: [afjø]; Occitan: Afièu) is a commune in the Corrèze department in the Nouvelle-Aquitaine region of central France.

The inhabitants of the commune are known as Affieucois or Affieucoises.

The commune has been awarded two flowers by the National Council of Towns and Villages in Bloom in the Competition of cities and villages in Bloom.

== Geography ==
Affieux is located some 45 km south-east of Limoges (in a straight line). Access to the commune is by road D940 from Treignac in the north passing south through the east of the commune to Le Lonzac. The D20 road also comes from Treignac, changing to the D3E3 in the commune and passing through the village before continuing south-west to join the D3 south-west of the commune.

The Vézère river forms the western and northern border of the commune with numerous streams criss-crossing the commune and flowing to this river. There is also a lake to the south of the town of Affieux.

=== Localities and villages ===
- Affieux
- Les Rivieres
- La Louche
- La Gane
- Le Fargeau
- Espinet
- Le Peuch
- Marcilloux
- Merciel

== Heraldry ==
Arms of Affieux	Blazon: Or, 3 escallops Vert 2 on 1, canton also of Or with 2 lions passant in Gules.

== Administration ==
List of Successive Mayors of Affieux

From	To	Name
2001	2020	Guy Germain
2020	2026	Didier Jarrige

== Population ==
Historical population

Year	Pop.	±% p.a.
1793	774	—
1800	1,100	+5.15%
1806	1,153	+0.79%
1821	859	−1.94%
1831	990	+1.43%
1836	1,064	+1.45%
1841	1,041	−0.44%
1846	1,077	+0.68%
1851	968	−2.11%
1856	1,046	+1.56%
1861	1,013	−0.64%
1866	833	−3.84%
1872	937	+1.98%
1876	1,072	+3.42%
1881	986	−1.66%
1886	1,057	+1.40%
1891	1,075	+0.34%
1896	885	−3.82%
1901	884	−0.02%

Year	Pop.	±% p.a.
1906	906	+0.49%
1911	839	−1.52%
1921	735	−1.31%
1926	675	−1.69%
1931	660	−0.45%
1936	664	+0.12%
1946	581	−1.33%
1954	567	−0.30%
1962	506	−1.41%
1968	432	−2.60%
1975	357	−2.69%
1982	356	−0.04%
1990	358	+0.07%
1999	349	−0.28%
2007	368	+0.66%
2012	369	+0.05%
2017	359	−0.55%
2023	385	+1.17%

Source: EHESS and INSEE

== Culture and heritage ==
=== Civil heritage ===
The commune has a number of buildings and structures that are registered as historical monuments:

- A Chateau at le Peuch (16th century)
- The Chateau de Maury (19th century)
- A Chateau at Balème (17th century)
- A Farmhouse at l'Allouche (1605)
- A Chateau (1636)
- Farmhouses (17th-20th centuries)

=== Religious heritage ===
The commune has several religious buildings and structures that are registered as historical monuments:

- The Chapel of Notre-Dame-de-Lourdes (1874)
- A Cemetery Cross (19th century)
- A Monumental Cross (18th century)
- Monumental Crosses (17th-20th centuries)
- The Parish Church of Saint-Pardoux (1772)

The Parish Church contains many items that are registered as historical objects:

- An Altar tombstone, 2 altar seatings, the Altar, a winged Tabernacle, and exhibition dais (17th century)
- A sun-shaped Monstrance (1819)
- A Tombstone
- A Flowered Vase (19th century)
- A Flowered Vase (19th century)
- A sun-shaped Monstrance (1819)
- A Ciborium for the sick (19th century)
- A Ciborium (1838)
- A Paten (1838)
- A Chalice with Paten (19th century)
- A Chalice (1838)
- A Statuette: Immaculate conception (18th century)
- 2 Statues: Kneeling angels worshipping (17th century)
- 2 Statues: Standing angels worshipping (17th century)
- A Tabernacle (18th century)
- Altar seating, Tabernacle and exhibition (18th century)
- Altar tomb (18th century)
- Secondary Altar: Altar, seating, and Tabernacle (18th century)
- A Tabernacle Urn (1768)
- 2 Statues: Saint Gilles and Saint Pardoux (1768)
- An Altar Painting: The Assumption (1768)
- The Retable architecture (1768)
- A Baptismal font (13th century)
- A Stoup (19th century)

== Notable People linked to the Commune ==
- Jean Alambre: a writer and composer in French and Occitan
- Élise Palaudoux (called Nataska): (1895-1985), a designer. Her designs were shown at the Museum of Art Brut or Outsider Art in Lausanne. A street in the commune of Cabestany (Pyrénées-Orientales), bears the name "Nataska".

== See also ==
- Communes of the Corrèze department
