= Rilhac-Treignac =

- Commune
- Coat of arms
- Location of Rilhac-Treignac
- Location within France Location within Nouvelle-Aquitaine
- Coordinates: 45°31′38″N 1°41′10″E
- Country: France
- Region: Nouvelle-Aquitaine
- Department: Corrèze
- Arrondissement: Tulle
- Canton: Seilhac-Monédières

Government
  - Mayor (2020–2026): Estelle Bouchot
- Area^{1}: 9.42 km^{2} (3.64 sq mi)
- Elevation: 450 m (1,480 ft)
- Highest elevation: 500 m (1,600 ft)
- Lowest elevation: 355 m (1,165 ft)
- Population (2023): 117
  - Density: 12.4/km^{2} (32.2/sq mi)
- Time zone: UTC+01:00 (CET)
  - Summer (DST): UTC+02:00 (CEST)
- INSEE/Postal code: 19172 /19260
- ^{1} French Land Register data, which excludes lakes, ponds, glaciers > 1 km^{2} (0.386 sq mi or 247 acres) and river estuaries.

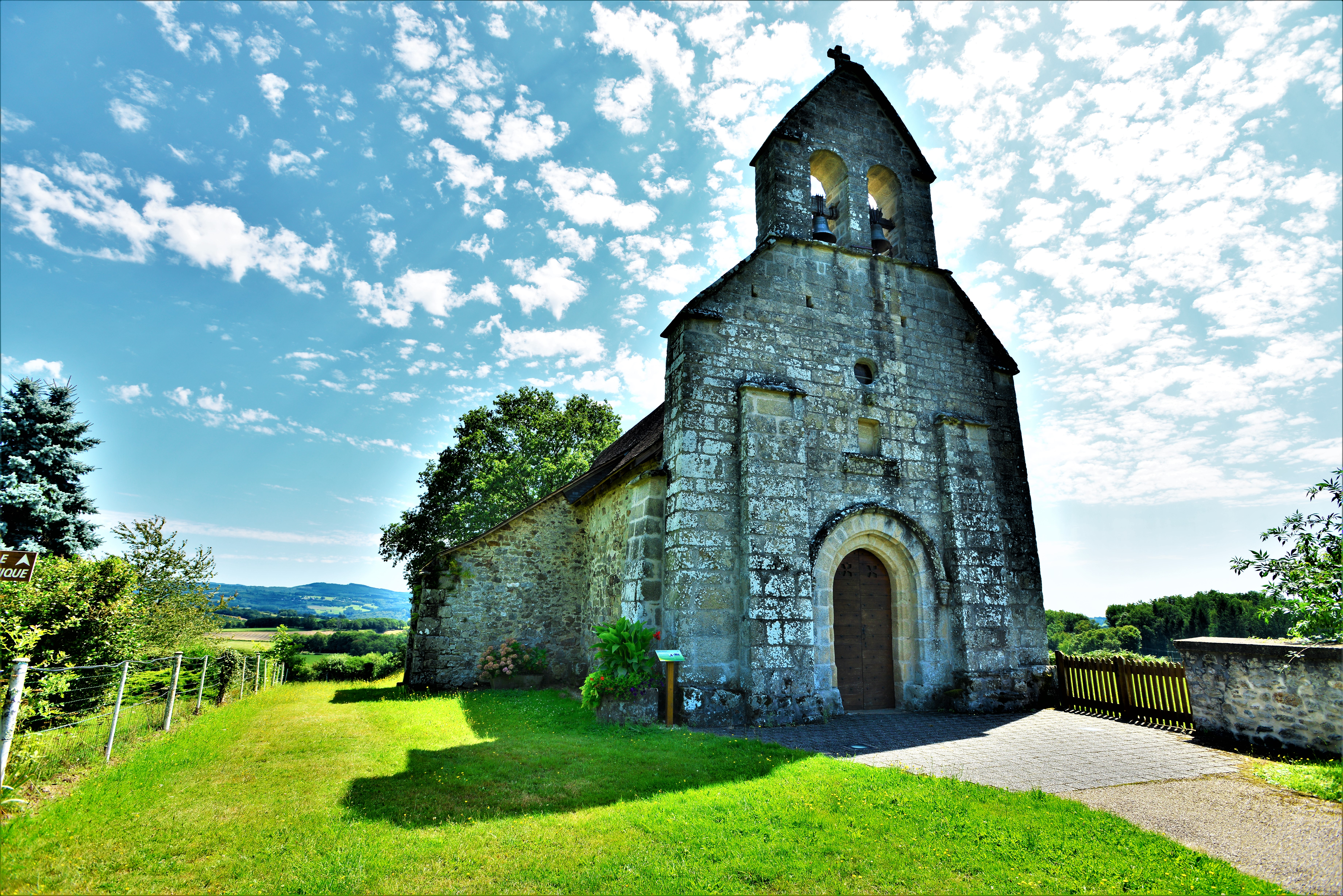
L'église de Rilhac-Treignac, Corrèze, France

Rilhac-Treignac (French pronunciation: [ʁijak tʁɛɲak]; Occitan: Rilhac de Trainhac) is a commune in the Corrèze department in the Nouvelle-Aquitaine region in central France.

The closest neighboring communes are Chamberet (8 km), Treignac (12 km), and Uzerche (18 km).

== Population ==
Historical population
Year	Pop.	±% p.a.
1968	216	—
1975	162	−4.03%
1982	148	−1.28%
1990	131	−1.51%
1999	121	−0.88%
2007	114	−0.74%
2012	117	+0.52%
2017	110	−1.23%
2023	117	+1.03%
Source: INSEE

== See also ==
- Communes of the Corrèze department
