= Saint-Hilaire-les-Courbes =

- Commune
- Coat of arms
- Location of Saint-Hilaire-les-Courbes
- Location within France Location within Nouvelle-Aquitaine
- Coordinates: 45°36′41″N 1°50′04″E
- Country: France
- Region: Nouvelle-Aquitaine
- Department: Corrèze
- Arrondissement: Tulle
- Canton: Seilhac-Monédières

Government
  - Mayor (2020–2026): Philippe Jenty
- Area^{1}: 36.36 km^{2} (14.04 sq mi)
- Elevation: 680 m (2,230 ft)
- Highest elevation: 809 m (2,654 ft)
- Lowest elevation: 484 m (1,588 ft)
- Population (2023): 178
  - Density: 4.90/km^{2} (12.7/sq mi)
- Time zone: UTC+01:00 (CET)
  - Summer (DST): UTC+02:00 (CEST)
- INSEE/Postal code: 19209 /19170
- ^{1} French Land Register data, which excludes lakes, ponds, glaciers > 1 km^{2} (0.386 sq mi or 247 acres) and river estuaries.

Saint-Hilaire-les-Courbes (French pronunciation: [sɛ̃.t‿ilɛʁ le kuʁb]; Occitan: Sent Alari de las Corbas) is a commune in the Corrèze department in central France.

== Population ==
Historical population
Year	Pop.	±% p.a.
1968	328	—
1975	245	−4.08%
1982	208	−2.31%
1990	180	−1.79%
1999	171	−0.57%
2007	161	−0.75%
2012	155	−0.76%
2017	158	+0.38%
2023	178	+2.01%
Source: INSEE

== See also ==
- Communes of the Corrèze department
