= L'Église-aux-Bois =

- Commune
- Coat of arms
- Location of L'Église-aux-Bois
- Location within France Location within Nouvelle-Aquitaine
- Coordinates: 45°38′59″N 1°48′10″E
- Country: France
- Region: Nouvelle-Aquitaine
- Department: Corrèze
- Arrondissement: Tulle
- Canton: Seilhac-Monédières

Government
  - Mayor (2020–2026): Simone Jamilloux-Verdier
- Area^{1}: 16.2 km^{2} (6.3 sq mi)
- Highest elevation: 753 m (2,470 ft)
- Lowest elevation: 518 m (1,699 ft)
- Population (2023): 50
  - Density: 3.1/km^{2} (8.0/sq mi)
- Time zone: UTC+01:00 (CET)
  - Summer (DST): UTC+02:00 (CEST)
- INSEE/Postal code: 19074 /19170
- ^{1} French Land Register data, which excludes lakes, ponds, glaciers > 1 km^{2} (0.386 sq mi or 247 acres) and river estuaries.

L'Église-aux-Bois (French pronunciation: [leɡliz o bwa]; Occitan: L'Egleisa aus Bòscs) is a commune in the Corrèze department in central France.

== Population ==
Historical population
Year	Pop.	±% p.a.
1968	139	—
1975	98	−4.87%
1982	75	−3.75%
1990	59	−2.95%
1999	41	−3.96%
2007	37	−1.27%
2012	58	+9.41%
2017	55	−1.06%
2023	50	−1.58%
Source: INSEE

== See also ==
- Communes of the Corrèze department
