= Peyrissac =

- Commune
- Coat of arms
- Location of Peyrissac
- Location within France Location within Nouvelle-Aquitaine
- Coordinates: 45°30′11″N 1°42′00″E
- Country: France
- Region: Nouvelle-Aquitaine
- Department: Corrèze
- Arrondissement: Tulle
- Canton: Seilhac-Monédières
- Intercommunality: Vézère-Monédières-Millesources

Government
  - Mayor (2020–2026): Josiane Vigroux-Sardenne
- Area^{1}: 5.89 km^{2} (2.27 sq mi)
- Highest elevation: 442 m (1,450 ft)
- Lowest elevation: 331 m (1,086 ft)
- Population (2023): 133
  - Density: 22.6/km^{2} (58.5/sq mi)
- Time zone: UTC+01:00 (CET)
  - Summer (DST): UTC+02:00 (CEST)
- INSEE/Postal code: 19165 /19260
- ^{1} French Land Register data, which excludes lakes, ponds, glaciers > 1 km^{2} (0.386 sq mi or 247 acres) and river estuaries.

Peyrissac (French pronunciation: [peʁisak]; Occitan: Pairiçac) is a commune in the Corrèze department of Nouvelle-Aquitaine in central France.

== Geography ==
Located on the Plateau de Millevaches in the Millevaches regional nature park, Peyrissac is a commune of the Massif Central. It is situated along the course of the Bradascour river, a tributary of the Vézère.

== History ==
=== Heraldry ===
Coat of arms of Peyrissac	Azure, two lions rampant argent langued and armed gules.

== Population ==
Historical population
Year	Pop.	±% p.a.
1968	148	—
1975	131	−1.73%
1982	110	−2.47%
1990	106	−0.46%
1999	140	+3.14%
2007	136	−0.36%
2012	134	−0.30%
2017	127	−1.07%
2023	133	+0.77%
Source: INSEE

== See also ==
- Communes of the Corrèze department
