= Lacelle =

- Commune
- Coat of arms
- Location of Lacelle
- Location within France Location within Nouvelle-Aquitaine
- Coordinates: 45°38′31″N 1°49′36″E
- Country: France
- Region: Nouvelle-Aquitaine
- Department: Corrèze
- Arrondissement: Tulle
- Canton: Seilhac-Monédières
- Intercommunality: Vézère-Monédières-Millesources

Government
  - Mayor (2020–2026): Véronique Bonnet-Teneze
- Area^{1}: 20.58 km^{2} (7.95 sq mi)
- Highest elevation: 800 m (2,600 ft)
- Lowest elevation: 553 m (1,814 ft)
- Population (2023): 137
  - Density: 6.66/km^{2} (17.2/sq mi)
- Time zone: UTC+01:00 (CET)
  - Summer (DST): UTC+02:00 (CEST)
- INSEE/Postal code: 19095 /19170
- ^{1} French Land Register data, which excludes lakes, ponds, glaciers > 1 km^{2} (0.386 sq mi or 247 acres) and river estuaries.

Lacelle (French pronunciation: [lasɛl]; Occitan: La Cela) is a commune in the Corrèze department of central France.

== Geography ==
=== Location ===
Commune of Massif Central located on the Plateau de Millevaches in the Regional Nature Park of Millevaches in the Limousin. It is adjacent to the Haute-Vienne department.

== Population ==
Historical population
Year	Pop.	±% p.a.
1968	364	—
1975	280	−3.68%
1982	221	−3.32%
1990	185	−2.20%
1999	140	−3.05%
2007	140	+0.00%
2012	129	−1.62%
2017	137	+1.21%
2023	137	+0.00%
Source: INSEE

== See also ==
- Communes of the Corrèze department
