= Arrondissement of Tulle =

Coordinates: 45.27°N 1.77°E

Tulle
- Arrondissement
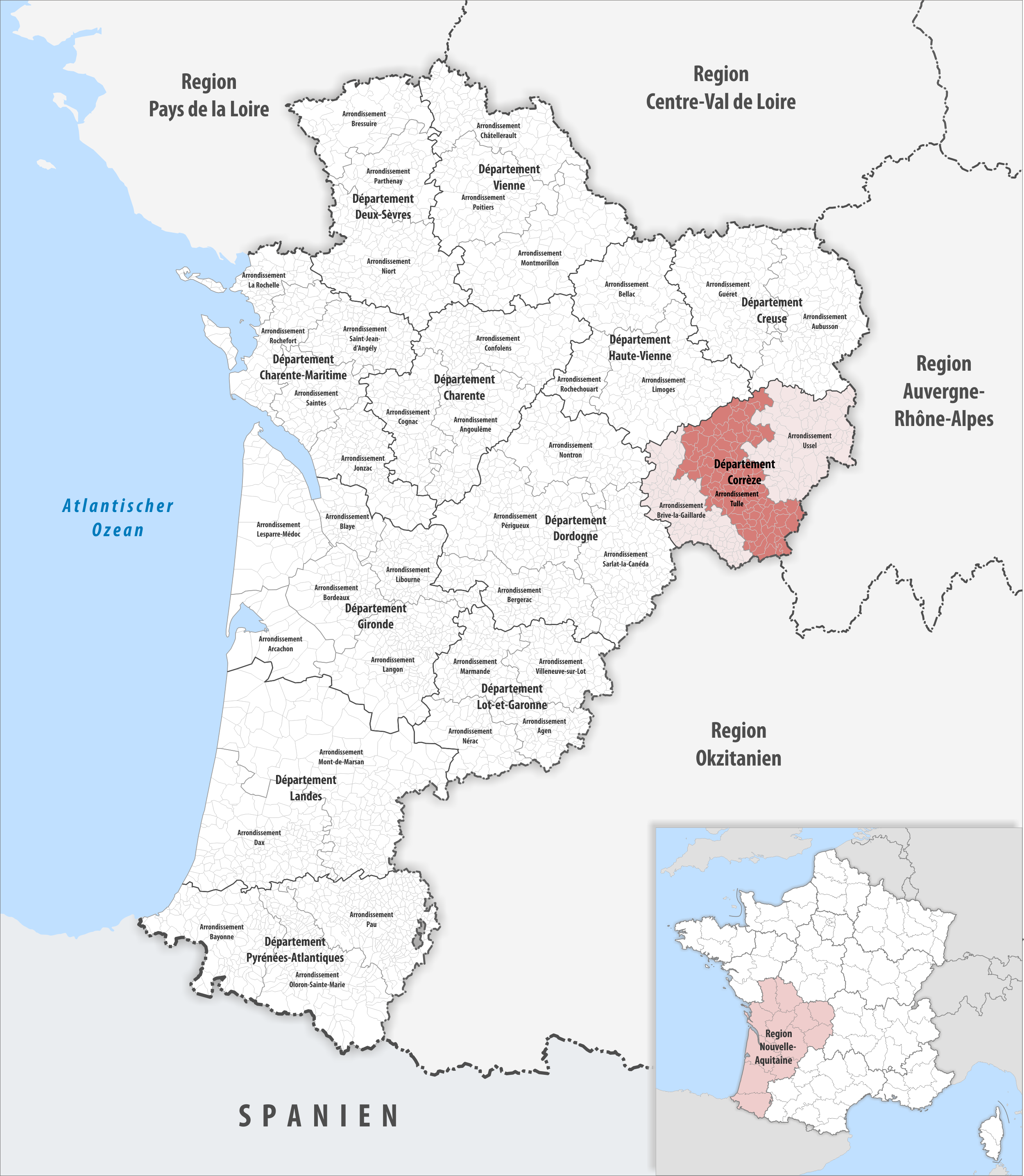
- Location within the region Nouvelle-Aquitaine
- Country: France
- Region: Nouvelle-Aquitaine
- Department: Corrèze
- No. of communes: {{{nbcomm}}}
- Area: 2,394.7 km^{2} (924.6 sq mi)
- Population (2023): 70,756
  - Density: 29.547/km^{2} (76.526/sq mi)
- INSEE code: 192

The arrondissement of Tulle is an arrondissement of France in the Corrèze department in the Nouvelle-Aquitaine region. It has 105 communes. Its population is 70,680 (2021), and its area is 2,394.7 km^{2} (924.6 sq mi).

== Composition ==
The communes of the arrondissement of Tulle, and their INSEE codes, are:

1. Affieux (19001)
2. Albussac (19004)
3. Les Angles-sur-Corrèze (19009)
4. Argentat-sur-Dordogne (19010)
5. Auriac (19014)
6. Bar (19016)
7. Bassignac-le-Bas (19017)
8. Bassignac-le-Haut (19018)
9. Beaumont (19020)
10. Bonnefond (19027)
11. Bugeat (19033)
12. Camps-Saint-Mathurin-Léobazel (19034)
13. Chamberet (19036)
14. Chamboulive (19037)
15. Chameyrat (19038)
16. Champagnac-la-Prune (19040)
17. Chanac-les-Mines (19041)
18. Chanteix (19042)
19. La Chapelle-Saint-Géraud (19045)
20. Le Chastang (19048)
21. Clergoux (19056)
22. Condat-sur-Ganaveix (19060)
23. Cornil (19061)
24. Corrèze (19062)
25. Darazac (19069)
26. L'Église-aux-Bois (19074)
27. Espagnac (19075)
28. Espartignac (19076)
29. Eyburie (19079)
30. Eyrein (19081)
31. Favars (19082)
32. Forgès (19084)
33. Gimel-les-Cascades (19085)
34. Goulles (19086)
35. Gourdon-Murat (19087)
36. Grandsaigne (19088)
37. Gros-Chastang (19089)
38. Gumond (19090)
39. Hautefage (19091)
40. Lacelle (19095)
41. Ladignac-sur-Rondelles (19096)
42. Lagarde-Marc-la-Tour (19098)
43. Lagraulière (19100)
44. Laguenne-sur-Avalouze (19101)
45. Lamongerie (19104)
46. Lestards (19112)
47. Le Lonzac (19118)
48. Madranges (19122)
49. Masseret (19129)
50. Meilhards (19131)
51. Mercœur (19133)
52. Monceaux-sur-Dordogne (19140)
53. Naves (19146)
54. Neuville (19149)
55. Orgnac-sur-Vézère (19154)
56. Orliac-de-Bar (19155)
57. Pandrignes (19158)
58. Perpezac-le-Noir (19162)
59. Peyrissac (19165)
60. Pierrefitte (19166)
61. Pradines (19168)
62. Reygade (19171)
63. Rilhac-Treignac (19172)
64. Rilhac-Xaintrie (19173)
65. La Roche-Canillac (19174)
66. Saint-Augustin (19181)
67. Saint-Bonnet-Elvert (19186)
68. Saint-Bonnet-les-Tours-de-Merle (19189)
69. Saint-Chamant (19192)
70. Saint-Cirgues-la-Loutre (19193)
71. Saint-Clément (19194)
72. Sainte-Fortunade (19203)
73. Saint-Geniez-ô-Merle (19205)
74. Saint-Germain-les-Vergnes (19207)
75. Saint-Hilaire-les-Courbes (19209)
76. Saint-Hilaire-Peyroux (19211)
77. Saint-Hilaire-Taurieux (19212)
78. Saint-Jal (19213)
79. Saint-Julien-aux-Bois (19214)
80. Saint-Julien-le-Pèlerin (19215)
81. Saint-Martial-de-Gimel (19220)
82. Saint-Martial-Entraygues (19221)
83. Saint-Martin-la-Méanne (19222)
84. Saint-Mexant (19227)
85. Saint-Pardoux-la-Croisille (19231)
86. Saint-Paul (19235)
87. Saint-Priest-de-Gimel (19236)
88. Saint-Privat (19237)
89. Saint-Salvadour (19240)
90. Saint-Sylvain (19245)
91. Salon-la-Tour (19250)
92. Seilhac (19255)
93. Servières-le-Château (19258)
94. Sexcles (19259)
95. Soudaine-Lavinadière (19262)
96. Tarnac (19265)
97. Toy-Viam (19268)
98. Treignac (19269)
99. Les Trois-Saints (partly)(19248)
100. Tulle (19272)
101. Uzerche (19276)
102. Veix (19281)
103. Viam (19284)
104. Vigeois (19285)
105. Vitrac-sur-Montane (19287)

== History ==
The arrondissement of Tulle was created in 1800. At the January 2017 reorganisation of the arrondissements of Corrèze, it gained three communes from the arrondissement of Brive-la-Gaillarde and eight communes from the arrondissement of Ussel, and it lost two communes to the arrondissement of Brive-la-Gaillarde and 19 communes to the arrondissement of Ussel. In January 2024 the commune of Bugeat passed from the arrondissement of Ussel to the arrondissement of Tulle.

As a result of the reorganisation of the cantons of France which came into effect in 2015, the borders of the cantons are no longer related to the borders of the arrondissements. The cantons of the arrondissement of Tulle were, as of January 2015:

1. Argentat
2. Corrèze
3. Égletons
4. Lapleau
5. Mercœur
6. La Roche-Canillac
7. Saint-Privat
8. Seilhac
9. Treignac
10. Tulle-Campagne-Nord
11. Tulle-Campagne-Sud
12. Tulle-Urbain-Nord
13. Tulle-Urbain-Sud
14. Uzerche
