= Madranges =

- Commune
- Coat of arms
- Location of Madranges
- Location within France Location within Nouvelle-Aquitaine
- Coordinates: 45°28′32″N 1°47′28″E
- Country: France
- Region: Nouvelle-Aquitaine
- Department: Corrèze
- Arrondissement: Tulle
- Canton: Seilhac-Monédières
- Intercommunality: Vézère-Monédières-Millesources

Government
  - Mayor (2020–2026): Jean-Pierre Bort
- Area^{1}: 12.88 km^{2} (4.97 sq mi)
- Highest elevation: 800 m (2,600 ft)
- Lowest elevation: 494 m (1,621 ft)
- Population (2023): 166
  - Density: 12.9/km^{2} (33.4/sq mi)
- Time zone: UTC+01:00 (CET)
  - Summer (DST): UTC+02:00 (CEST)
- INSEE/Postal code: 19122 /19470
- ^{1} French Land Register data, which excludes lakes, ponds, glaciers > 1 km^{2} (0.386 sq mi or 247 acres) and river estuaries.

Madranges (French pronunciation: [madʁɑ̃ʒ]; Occitan: Madranjas) is a commune in the Corrèze department in central France in the Nouvelle-Aquitaine region.

== History ==
During the French Wars of Religion, Madranges was protestant during the 16th-century.

Protestantism took root in Madranges again between 1895 and 1897. Madranges was without a priest, had been ignored by the priest of Lonzac despite the requests of the parishioners. A temple was built and inaugurated on 11 March 1900. The pastoral post has not been filled since 1947.

== Geography ==
=== Location ===
A commune of the Massif Central situated on the Plateau de Millevaches in the Regional Nature Park of Millevaches in Limousin. It is watered by the streams of the Boulou and the Madrange, two tributaries of the Vézère river.

=== Population ===
Historical population
Year	Pop.	±% p.a.
1968	225	—
1975	159	−4.84%
1982	172	+1.13%
1990	174	+0.14%
1999	178	+0.25%
2007	187	+0.62%
2012	198	+1.15%
2017	193	−0.51%
2023	166	−2.48%
Source: INSEE

== Places and monuments ==
- Protestant Church - built by Adolphe Augustin Rey in 1900.
- Église Saint-Barthélemy de Madranges - the church was rebuilt in 1904 replacing an old 12th-century chapel.
- Granite cross - in the village , dating from 1647.
- Feugeas - village in the commune, slated houses dating from 17th and 19th-centuries.

== See also ==
- Communes of the Corrèze department
