= Saint-Mexant =

- Commune
- Coat of arms
- Location of Saint-Mexant
- Location within France Location within Nouvelle-Aquitaine
- Coordinates: 45°17′10″N 1°39′32″E
- Country: France
- Region: Nouvelle-Aquitaine
- Department: Corrèze
- Arrondissement: Tulle
- Canton: Naves
- Intercommunality: CA Tulle Agglo

Government
  - Mayor (2020–2026): Patrick Bordas
- Area^{1}: 18.64 km^{2} (7.20 sq mi)
- Elevation: 400 m (1,300 ft)
- Highest elevation: 482 m (1,581 ft)
- Lowest elevation: 314 m (1,030 ft)
- Population (2023): 1,330
  - Density: 71.4/km^{2} (185/sq mi)
- Time zone: UTC+01:00 (CET)
  - Summer (DST): UTC+02:00 (CEST)
- INSEE/Postal code: 19227 /19330
- ^{1} French Land Register data, which excludes lakes, ponds, glaciers > 1 km^{2} (0.386 sq mi or 247 acres) and river estuaries.

Saint-Mexant (French pronunciation: [sɛ̃ mɛksɑ̃]; Occitan: Sent Maissenç) is a commune in the Corrèze department in central France.

== Population ==
Historical population
Year	Pop.	±% p.a.
1968	694	—
1975	757	+1.25%
1982	916	+2.76%
1990	1,049	+1.71%
1999	1,030	−0.20%
2007	1,086	+0.66%
2012	1,212	+2.22%
2017	1,307	+1.52%
2023	1,330	+0.29%
Source: INSEE

== See also ==
- Communes of the Corrèze department
