= Beaumont, Corrèze =

Beaumont
- Commune
- Coat of arms
- Location of Beaumont
- Location within France Location within Nouvelle-Aquitaine
- Coordinates: 45°25′24″N 1°48′11″E
- Country: France
- Region: Nouvelle-Aquitaine
- Department: Corrèze
- Arrondissement: Tulle
- Canton: Seilhac-Monédières
- Intercommunality: CA Tulle Agglo

Government
  - Mayor (2020–2026): Sophie Roy
- Area^{1}: 10.9 km^{2} (4.2 sq mi)
- Elevation: 490 m (1,610 ft)
- Highest elevation: 570 m (1,870 ft)
- Lowest elevation: 350 m (1,150 ft)
- Population (2023): 114
  - Density: 10.5/km^{2} (27.1/sq mi)
- Time zone: UTC+01:00 (CET)
  - Summer (DST): UTC+02:00 (CEST)
- INSEE/Postal code: 19020 /19390
- ^{1} French Land Register data, which excludes lakes, ponds, glaciers > 1 km^{2} (0.386 sq mi or 247 acres) and river estuaries.

Beaumont (French pronunciation: [bomɔ̃]; Occitan: Beumont) is a commune in the Corrèze department in central France.

== Population ==
Historical population
Year	Pop.	±% p.a.
1968	208	—
1975	180	−2.04%
1982	160	−1.67%
1990	134	−2.19%
1999	128	−0.51%
2007	121	−0.70%
2012	111	−1.71%
2017	114	+0.53%
2023	114	+0.00%
Source: INSEE

== See also ==
- Communes of the Corrèze department
