= Canton of Seilhac-Monédières =

Coordinates: 45.37°N 1.71°E

The canton of Seilhac-Monédières is an administrative division of the Corrèze department, south-central France. It was created at the French canton reorganisation which came into effect in March 2015. Its seat is in Seilhac.

It consists of the following communes:

1. Affieux
2. Beaumont
3. Chamberet
4. Chamboulive
5. Chanteix
6. L'Église-aux-Bois
7. Lacelle
8. Lagraulière
9. Le Lonzac
10. Madranges
11. Peyrissac
12. Pierrefitte
13. Rilhac-Treignac
14. Saint-Clément
15. Saint-Hilaire-les-Courbes
16. Saint-Jal
17. Saint-Salvadour
18. Seilhac
19. Soudaine-Lavinadière
20. Treignac
21. Veix
