= Pierrefitte, Corrèze =

Pierrefitte
- Commune
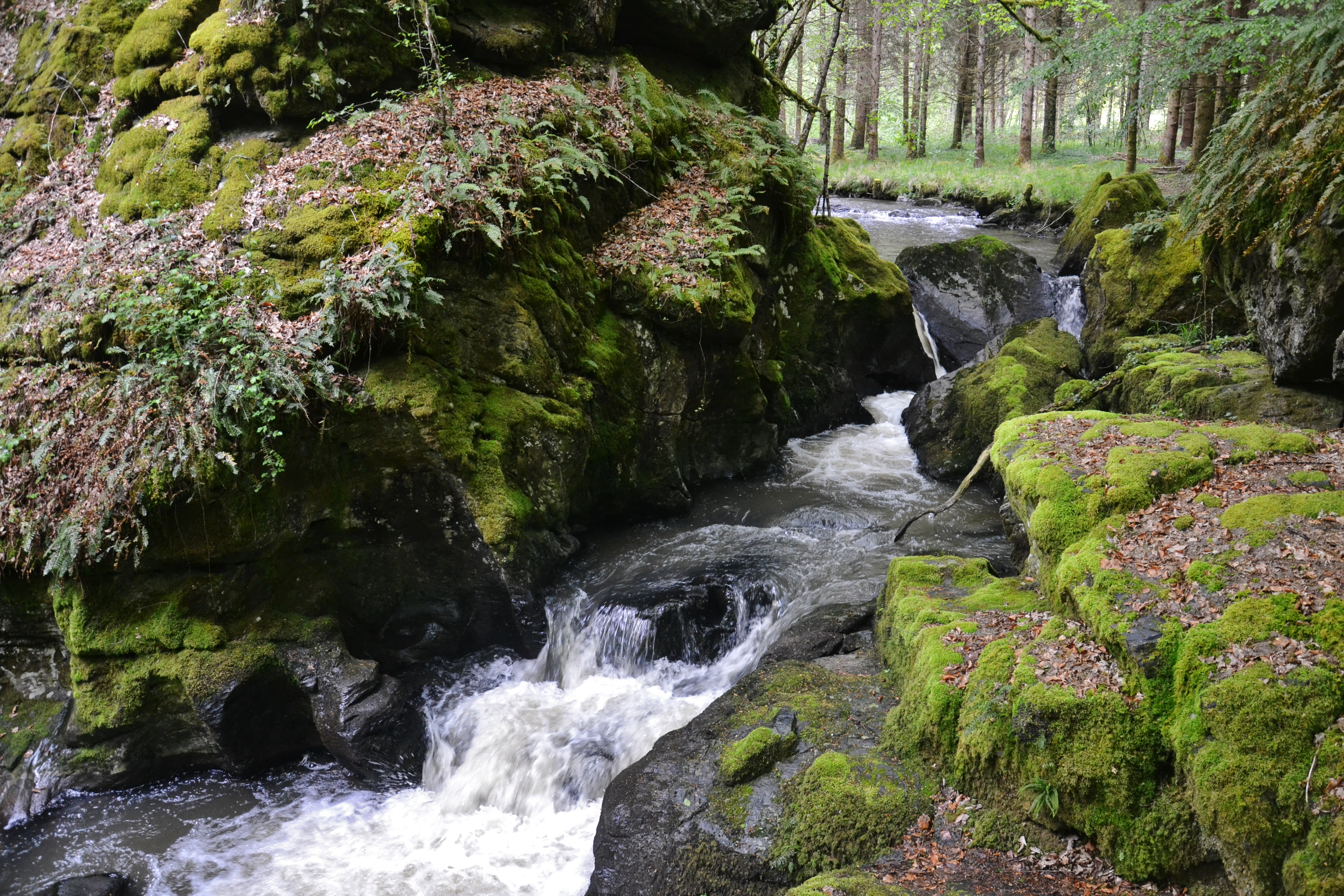
- The Rujoux, in Pierrefitte

- Coat of arms
- Location of Pierrefitte
- Location within France Location within Nouvelle-Aquitaine
- Coordinates: 45°25′26″N 1°38′57″E
- Country: France
- Region: Nouvelle-Aquitaine
- Department: Corrèze
- Arrondissement: Tulle
- Canton: Seilhac-Monédières
- Intercommunality: CA Tulle Agglo

Government
  - Mayor (2020–2026): Annie Cueille
- Area^{1}: 10.01 km^{2} (3.86 sq mi)
- Elevation: 385 m (1,263 ft)
- Highest elevation: 455 m (1,493 ft)
- Lowest elevation: 310 m (1,020 ft)
- Population (2023): 93
  - Density: 9.3/km^{2} (24/sq mi)
- Time zone: UTC+01:00 (CET)
  - Summer (DST): UTC+02:00 (CEST)
- INSEE/Postal code: 19166 /19450
- ^{1} French Land Register data, which excludes lakes, ponds, glaciers > 1 km^{2} (0.386 sq mi or 247 acres) and river estuaries.

Pierrefitte (French pronunciation: [pjɛʁfit]; Occitan: Peiraficha) is a commune in the Corrèze department in central France.

== Population ==
Historical population
Year	Pop.	±% p.a.
1968	149	—
1975	120	−3.04%
1982	92	−3.72%
1990	82	−1.43%
1999	79	−0.41%
2007	79	+0.00%
2012	83	+0.99%
2017	91	+1.86%
2023	93	+0.36%
Source: INSEE

== See also ==
- Communes of the Corrèze department
