= Saint-Salvadour =

- Commune
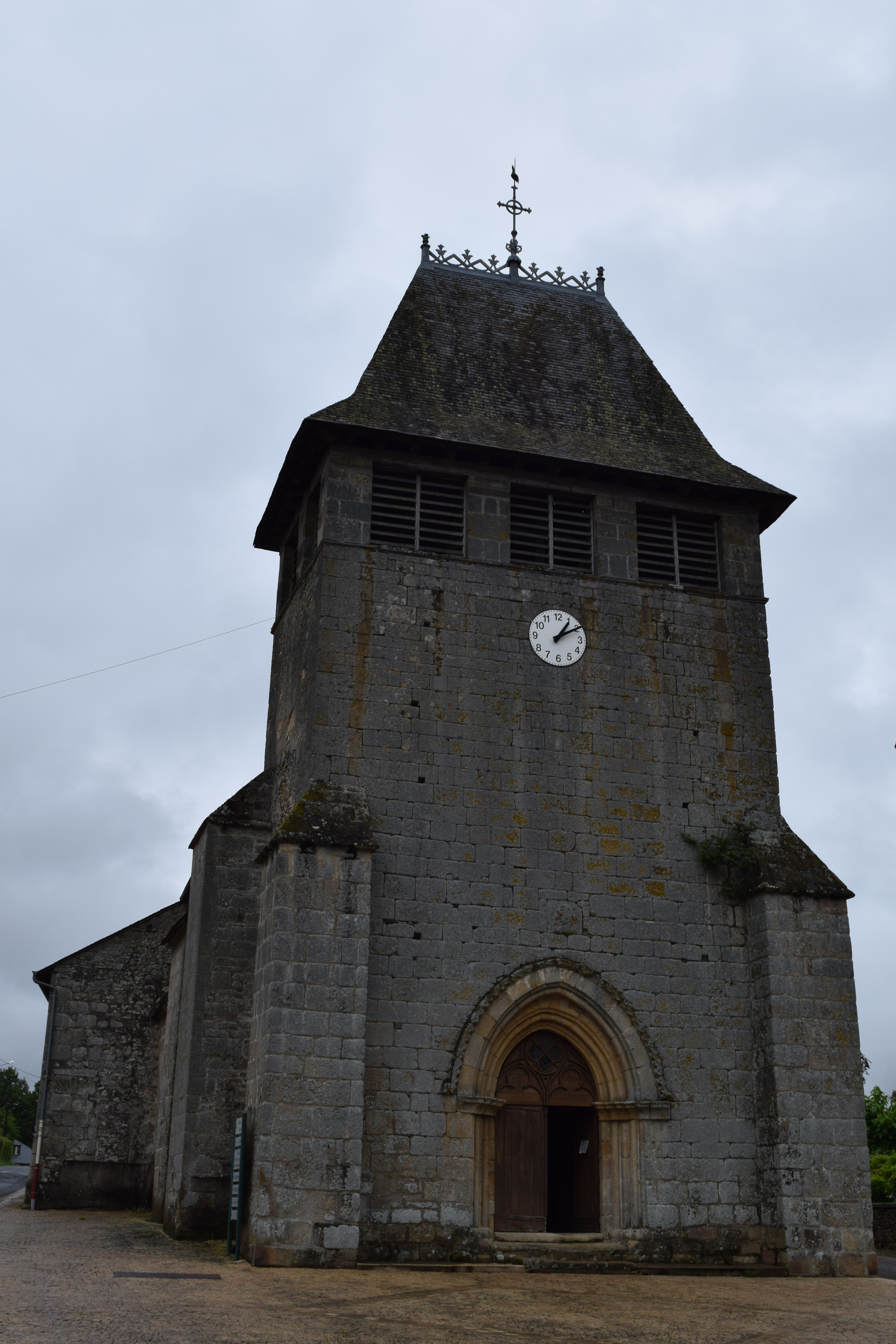
- The church of Saint-Sauveur, in Saint-Salvadour

- Coat of arms
- Location of Saint-Salvadour
- Location within France Location within Nouvelle-Aquitaine
- Coordinates: 45°23′44″N 1°46′02″E
- Country: France
- Region: Nouvelle-Aquitaine
- Department: Corrèze
- Arrondissement: Tulle
- Canton: Seilhac-Monédières
- Intercommunality: CA Tulle Agglo

Government
  - Mayor (2020–2026): Pierre-Marie Capy
- Area^{1}: 19.47 km^{2} (7.52 sq mi)
- Elevation: 425 m (1,394 ft)
- Highest elevation: 528 m (1,732 ft)
- Lowest elevation: 305 m (1,001 ft)
- Population (2023): 332
  - Density: 17.1/km^{2} (44.2/sq mi)
- Time zone: UTC+01:00 (CET)
  - Summer (DST): UTC+02:00 (CEST)
- INSEE/Postal code: 19240 /19700
- ^{1} French Land Register data, which excludes lakes, ponds, glaciers > 1 km^{2} (0.386 sq mi or 247 acres) and river estuaries.

Saint-Salvadour (French pronunciation: [sɛ̃ salvaduʁ]; Occitan: Sent Salvador) is a commune in the Corrèze department in central France.

== Population ==
Historical population
Year	Pop.	±% p.a.
1968	442	—
1975	356	−3.04%
1982	344	−0.49%
1990	292	−2.03%
1999	294	+0.08%
2007	291	−0.13%
2012	311	+1.34%
2017	300	−0.72%
2023	332	+1.70%
Source: INSEE

== See also ==
- Communes of the Corrèze department
