= Lamongerie =

- Commune
- Coat of arms
- Location of Lamongerie
- Location within France Location within Nouvelle-Aquitaine
- Coordinates: 45°32′N 1°34′E
- Country: France
- Region: Nouvelle-Aquitaine
- Department: Corrèze
- Arrondissement: Tulle
- Canton: Uzerche
- Intercommunality: Pays d'Uzerche

Government
  - Mayor (2020–2026): Michel Lautrette
- Area^{1}: 12.15 km^{2} (4.69 sq mi)
- Highest elevation: 498 m (1,634 ft)
- Lowest elevation: 393 m (1,289 ft)
- Population (2023): 124
  - Density: 10.2/km^{2} (26.4/sq mi)
- Time zone: UTC+01:00 (CET)
  - Summer (DST): UTC+02:00 (CEST)
- INSEE/Postal code: 19104 /19510
- ^{1} French Land Register data, which excludes lakes, ponds, glaciers > 1 km^{2} (0.386 sq mi or 247 acres) and river estuaries.

Lamongerie (French pronunciation: [lamɔ̃ʒʁi]; Occitan: La Monjariá) is a commune in the Corrèze department in central France.

== Population ==
Historical population
| Year | Pop. | ±% p.a. |
|---|---|---|
| 1968 | 180 | — |
| 1975 | 149 | −2.66% |
| 1982 | 134 | −1.50% |
| 1990 | 106 | −2.89% |
| 1999 | 83 | −2.68% |
| 2007 | 105 | +2.98% |
| 2012 | 118 | +2.36% |
| 2017 | 117 | −0.17% |
| 2023 | 124 | +0.97% |
Source: INSEE

== See also ==
- Communes of the Corrèze department
