= Lagraulière =

- Commune
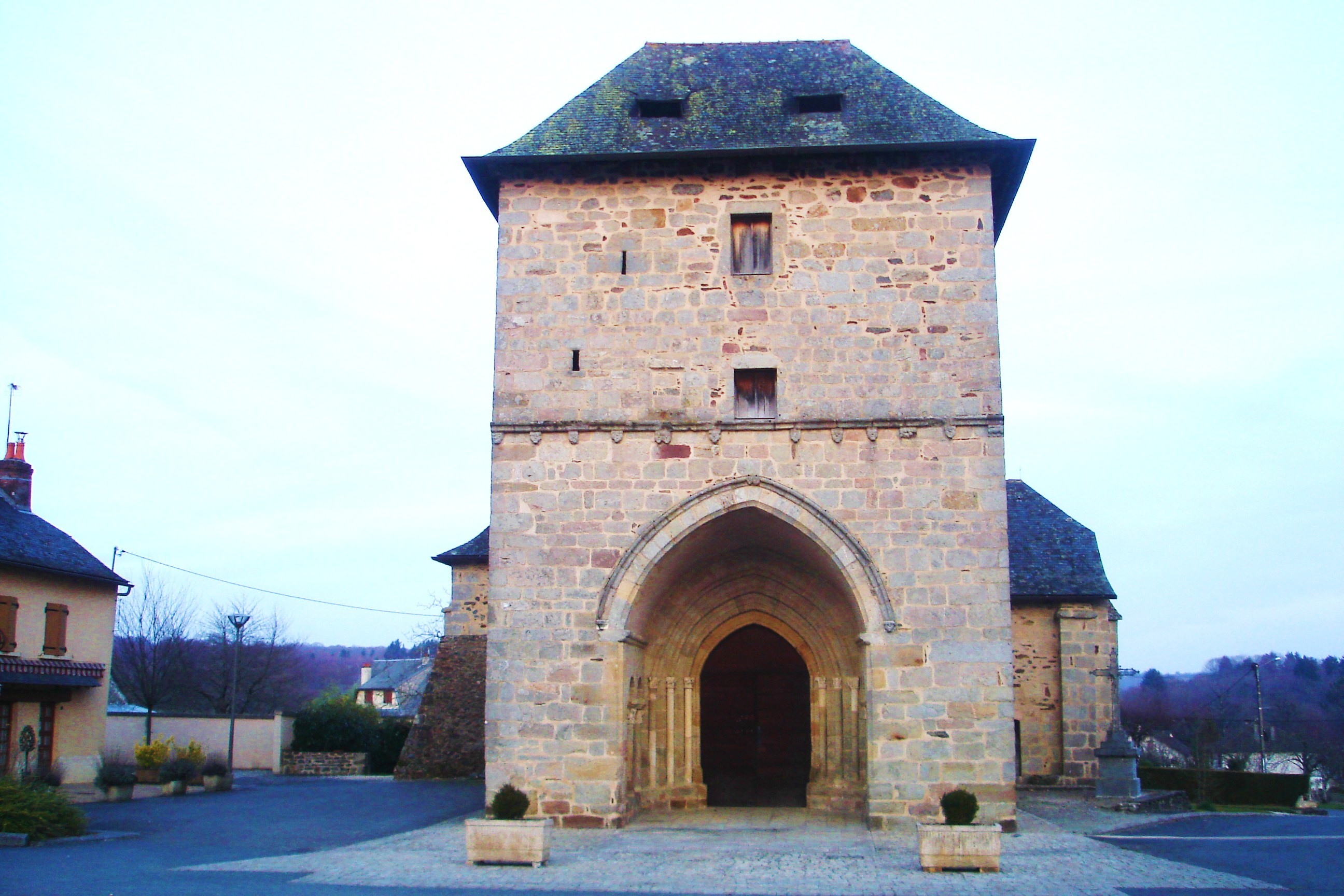
- The church in Lagraulière

- Coat of arms
- Location of Lagraulière
- Location within France Location within Nouvelle-Aquitaine
- Coordinates: 45°21′12″N 1°38′23″E
- Country: France
- Region: Nouvelle-Aquitaine
- Department: Corrèze
- Arrondissement: Tulle
- Canton: Seilhac-Monédières
- Intercommunality: CA Tulle Agglo

Government
  - Mayor (2020–2026): Ubald Chenou
- Area^{1}: 30.75 km^{2} (11.87 sq mi)
- Elevation: 400 m (1,300 ft)
- Highest elevation: 504 m (1,654 ft)
- Lowest elevation: 316 m (1,037 ft)
- Population (2023): 1,197
  - Density: 38.93/km^{2} (100.8/sq mi)
- Time zone: UTC+01:00 (CET)
  - Summer (DST): UTC+02:00 (CEST)
- INSEE/Postal code: 19100 /19700
- ^{1} French Land Register data, which excludes lakes, ponds, glaciers > 1 km^{2} (0.386 sq mi or 247 acres) and river estuaries.

Lagraulière (French pronunciation: [lagʁoljɛʁ]; Occitan: La Grauliera) is a commune in the Corrèze department in central France.

== Population ==
Historical population
Year	Pop.	±% p.a.
1968	1,072	—
1975	980	−1.27%
1982	1,010	+0.43%
1990	968	−0.53%
1999	921	−0.55%
2007	1,060	+1.77%
2012	1,144	+1.54%
2017	1,100	−0.78%
2023	1,197	+1.42%
Source: INSEE

== See also ==
- Communes of the Corrèze department
