= Soudaine-Lavinadière =

- Commune
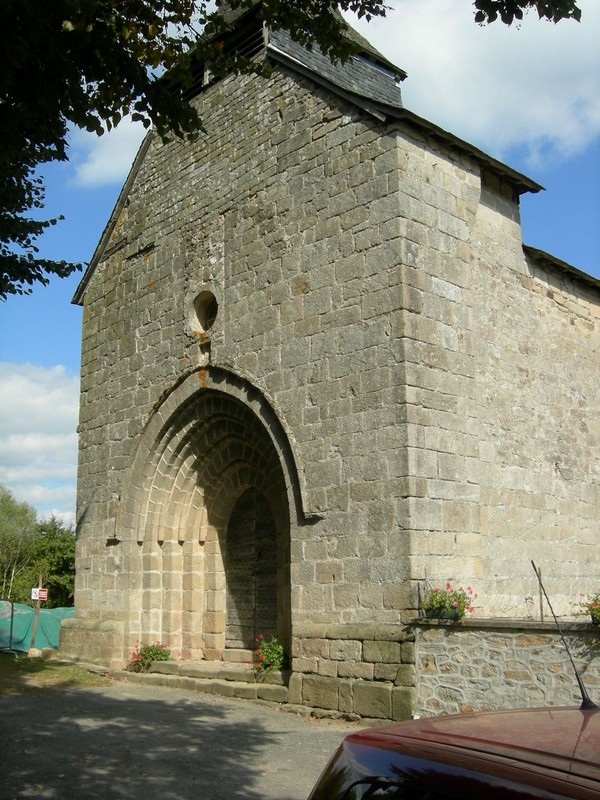
- The church in Soudaine-Lavinadière

- Coat of arms
- Location of Soudaine-Lavinadière
- Location within France Location within Nouvelle-Aquitaine
- Coordinates: 45°33′28″N 1°44′27″E
- Country: France
- Region: Nouvelle-Aquitaine
- Department: Corrèze
- Arrondissement: Tulle
- Canton: Seilhac-Monédières

Government
  - Mayor (2020–2026): Pierre Peyramaure
- Area^{1}: 21.86 km^{2} (8.44 sq mi)
- Highest elevation: 526 m (1,726 ft)
- Lowest elevation: 332 m (1,089 ft)
- Population (2023): 143
  - Density: 6.54/km^{2} (16.9/sq mi)
- Time zone: UTC+01:00 (CET)
  - Summer (DST): UTC+02:00 (CEST)
- INSEE/Postal code: 19262 /19370
- ^{1} French Land Register data, which excludes lakes, ponds, glaciers > 1 km^{2} (0.386 sq mi or 247 acres) and river estuaries.

Soudaine-Lavinadière (French pronunciation: [sudɛn lavinadjɛʁ]; Occitan: Sodena e la Vinadièra) is a commune in the Corrèze department in central France.

== Population ==
Historical population
Year	Pop.	±% p.a.
1968	319	—
1975	271	−2.30%
1982	233	−2.14%
1990	229	−0.22%
1999	193	−1.88%
2007	217	+1.48%
2012	166	−5.22%
2017	176	+1.18%
2023	143	−3.40%
Source: INSEE

== See also ==
- Communes of the Corrèze department
