= Communes of the Corrèze department =

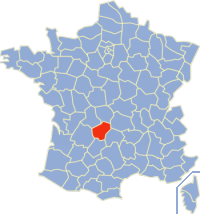

The following is a list of the 277 communes of the Corrèze department of France.

The communes cooperate in the following intercommunalities (as of 2025):

- Communauté d'agglomération du Bassin de Brive
- Communauté d'agglomération Tulle Agglo
- CC Haute-Corrèze Communauté (partly)
- Communauté de communes Midi Corrézien
- Communauté de communes du Pays de Lubersac-Pompadour
- Communauté de communes du Pays de Saint-Yrieix (partly)
- Communauté de communes du Pays d'Uzerche
- Communauté de communes de Ventadour - Égletons - Monédières
- Communauté de communes Vézère-Monédières-Millesources
- Communauté de communes Xaintrie Val'Dordogne

INSEE	Postal	Commune
19001	19260	Affieux
19002	19200	Aix
19003	19190	Albignac
19004	19380	Albussac
19005	19240	Allassac
19006	19200	Alleyrat
19007	19120	Altillac
19008	19250	Ambrugeat
19009	19000	Les Angles-sur-Corrèze
19010	19400	Argentat-sur-Dordogne
19011	19230	Arnac-Pompadour
19012	19120	Astaillac
19013	19190	Aubazines
19014	19220	Auriac
19015	19310	Ayen
19016	19800	Bar
19017	19430	Bassignac-le-Bas
19018	19220	Bassignac-le-Haut
19019	19120	Beaulieu-sur-Dordogne
19020	19390	Beaumont
19021	19290	Bellechassagne
19022	19510	Benayes
19023	19190	Beynat
19024	19230	Beyssac
19025	19230	Beyssenac
19026	19120	Bilhac
19027	19170	Bonnefond
19028	19110	Bort-les-Orgues
19029	19500	Branceilles
19030	19310	Brignac-la-Plaine
19031	19100	Brive-la-Gaillarde
19033	19170	Bugeat
19034	19430	Camps-Saint-Mathurin-Léobazel
19035	19350	Chabrignac
19036	19370	Chamberet
19037	19450	Chamboulive
19038	19330	Chameyrat
19039	19320	Champagnac-la-Noaille
19040	19320	Champagnac-la-Prune
19041	19150	Chanac-les-Mines
19042	19330	Chanteix
19043	19360	La Chapelle-aux-Brocs
19044	19120	La Chapelle-aux-Saints
19045	19430	La Chapelle-Saint-Géraud
19046	19300	Chapelle-Spinasse
19047	19600	Chartrier-Ferrière
19048	19190	Le Chastang
19049	19600	Chasteaux
19050	19500	Chauffour-sur-Vell
19051	19390	Chaumeil
19052	19290	Chavanac
19053	19200	Chaveroche
19054	19120	Chenailler-Mascheix
19055	19160	Chirac-Bellevue
19056	19320	Clergoux
19057	19500	Collonges-la-Rouge
19058	19250	Combressol
19059	19350	Concèze
19060	19140	Condat-sur-Ganaveix
19167	19200	Confolent-Port-Dieu
19061	19150	Cornil
19062	19800	Corrèze
19063	19360	Cosnac
19064	19340	Couffy-sur-Sarsonne
19065	19340	Courteix
19066	19520	Cublac
19067	19500	Curemonte
19068	19360	Dampniat
19069	19220	Darazac
19070	19300	Darnets
19071	19250	Davignac
19072	19270	Donzenac
19073	19300	Égletons
19074	19170	L'Église-aux-Bois
19075	19150	Espagnac
19076	19140	Espartignac
19077	19600	Estivals
19078	19410	Estivaux
19079	19140	Eyburie
19080	19340	Eygurande
19081	19800	Eyrein
19082	19330	Favars
19083	19340	Feyt
19084	19380	Forgès
19085	19800	Gimel-les-Cascades
19086	19430	Goulles
19087	19170	Gourdon-Murat
19088	19300	Grandsaigne
19089	19320	Gros-Chastang
19090	19320	Gumond
19091	19400	Hautefage
19093	19500	Jugeals-Nazareth
19094	19350	Juillac
19095	19170	Lacelle
19096	19150	Ladignac-sur-Rondelles
19097	19320	Lafage-sur-Sombre
19098	19150	Lagarde-Marc-la-Tour
19099	19500	Lagleygeolle
19100	19700	Lagraulière
19101	19150	Laguenne-sur-Avalouze
19102	19160	Lamazière-Basse
19103	19340	Lamazière-Haute
19104	19510	Lamongerie
19105	19190	Lanteuil
19106	19550	Lapleau
19107	19600	Larche
19108	19340	Laroche-près-Feyt
19109	19130	Lascaux
19110	19160	Latronche
19111	19550	Laval-sur-Luzège
19112	19170	Lestards
19113	19160	Liginiac
19114	19200	Lignareix
19115	19500	Ligneyrac
19116	19120	Liourdres
19117	19600	Lissac-sur-Couze
19118	19470	Le Lonzac
19119	19500	Lostanges
19120	19310	Louignac
19121	19210	Lubersac
19122	19470	Madranges
19123	19360	Malemort
19124	19520	Mansac
19125	19320	Marcillac-la-Croisille
19126	19500	Marcillac-la-Croze
19128	19200	Margerides
19129	19510	Masseret
19130	19250	Maussac
19131	19510	Meilhards
19132	19190	Ménoire
19133	19430	Mercœur
19134	19340	Merlines
19135	19200	Mestes
19136	19250	Meymac
19137	19800	Meyrignac-l'Église
19138	19500	Meyssac
19139	19290	Millevaches
19140	19400	Monceaux-sur-Dordogne
19141	19340	Monestier-Merlines
19142	19110	Monestier-Port-Dieu
19143	19300	Montaignac-sur-Doustre
19144	19210	Montgibaud
19145	19300	Moustier-Ventadour
19146	19460	Naves
19147	19600	Nespouls
19148	19160	Neuvic
19149	19380	Neuville
19150	19500	Noailhac
19151	19600	Noailles
19152	19120	Nonards
19153	19130	Objat
19154	19410	Orgnac-sur-Vézère
19155	19390	Orliac-de-Bar
19156	19190	Palazinges
19157	19160	Palisse
19158	19150	Pandrignes
19159	19300	Péret-Bel-Air
19160	19170	Pérols-sur-Vézère
19161	19310	Perpezac-le-Blanc
19162	19410	Perpezac-le-Noir
19163	19190	Le Pescher
19164	19290	Peyrelevade
19165	19260	Peyrissac
19166	19450	Pierrefitte
19168	19170	Pradines
19169	19120	Puy-d'Arnac
19170	19120	Queyssac-les-Vignes
19171	19430	Reygade
19172	19260	Rilhac-Treignac
19173	19220	Rilhac-Xaintrie
19174	19320	La Roche-Canillac
19175	19160	Roche-le-Peyroux
19176	19300	Rosiers-d'Égletons
19177	19350	Rosiers-de-Juillac
19178	19270	Sadroc
19179	19500	Saillac
19180	19200	Saint-Angel
19181	19390	Saint-Augustin
19182	19130	Saint-Aulaire
19184	19500	Saint-Bazile-de-Meyssac
19186	19380	Saint-Bonnet-Elvert
19187	19130	Saint-Bonnet-la-Rivière
19188	19410	Saint-Bonnet-l'Enfantier
19189	19430	Saint-Bonnet-les-Tours-de-Merle
19190	19200	Saint-Bonnet-près-Bort
19191	19600	Saint-Cernin-de-Larche
19192	19380	Saint-Chamant
19193	19220	Saint-Cirgues-la-Loutre
19194	19700	Saint-Clément
19195	19130	Saint-Cyprien
19196	19130	Saint-Cyr-la-Roche
19202	19270	Sainte-Féréole
19203	19490	Sainte-Fortunade
19198	19210	Saint-Éloy-les-Tuileries
19219	19160	Sainte-Marie-Lapanouze
19199	19200	Saint-Étienne-aux-Clos
19200	19160	Saint-Étienne-la-Geneste
19201	19200	Saint-Exupéry-les-Roches
19204	19200	Saint-Fréjoux
19205	19220	Saint-Geniez-ô-Merle
19206	19290	Saint-Germain-Lavolps
19207	19330	Saint-Germain-les-Vergnes
19208	19550	Saint-Hilaire-Foissac
19209	19170	Saint-Hilaire-les-Courbes
19210	19160	Saint-Hilaire-Luc
19211	19560	Saint-Hilaire-Peyroux
19212	19400	Saint-Hilaire-Taurieux
19213	19700	Saint-Jal
19214	19220	Saint-Julien-aux-Bois
19215	19430	Saint-Julien-le-Pèlerin
19216	19210	Saint-Julien-le-Vendômois
19217	19500	Saint-Julien-Maumont
19220	19150	Saint-Martial-de-Gimel
19221	19400	Saint-Martial-Entraygues
19222	19320	Saint-Martin-la-Méanne
19225	19320	Saint-Merd-de-Lapleau
19226	19170	Saint-Merd-les-Oussines
19227	19330	Saint-Mexant
19228	19160	Saint-Pantaléon-de-Lapleau
19229	19600	Saint-Pantaléon-de-Larche
19231	19320	Saint-Pardoux-la-Croisille
19232	19200	Saint-Pardoux-le-Neuf
19233	19200	Saint-Pardoux-le-Vieux
19234	19270	Saint-Pardoux-l'Ortigier
19235	19150	Saint-Paul
19236	19800	Saint-Priest-de-Gimel
19237	19220	Saint-Privat
19238	19290	Saint-Rémy
19239	19310	Saint-Robert
19240	19700	Saint-Salvadour
19241	19290	Saint-Setiers
19242	19130	Saint-Solve
19243	19230	Saint-Sornin-Lavolps
19244	19250	Saint-Sulpice-les-Bois
19245	19380	Saint-Sylvain
19246	19240	Saint-Viance
19247	19200	Saint-Victour
19249	19300	Saint-Yrieix-le-Déjalat
19250	19510	Salon-la-Tour
19251	19800	Sarran
19252	19110	Sarroux-Saint Julien
19253	19310	Segonzac
19254	19230	Ségur-le-Château
19255	19700	Seilhac
19256	19160	Sérandon
19257	19190	Sérilhac
19258	19220	Servières-le-Château
19259	19430	Sexcles
19260	19120	Sioniac
19261	19290	Sornac
19262	19370	Soudaine-Lavinadière
19263	19300	Soudeilles
19264	19550	Soursac
19265	19170	Tarnac
19266	19200	Thalamy
19268	19170	Toy-Viam
19269	19260	Treignac
19270	19230	Troche
19248	19140	Les Trois-Saints
19271	19120	Tudeils
19272	19000	Tulle
19273	19500	Turenne
19274	19270	Ussac
19275	19200	Ussel
19276	19140	Uzerche
19277	19200	Valiergues
19278	19240	Varetz
19279	19130	Vars-sur-Roseix
19280	19120	Végennes
19281	19260	Veix
19283	19200	Veyrières
19284	19170	Viam
19285	19410	Vigeois
19286	19130	Vignols
19287	19800	Vitrac-sur-Montane
19288	19130	Voutezac
19289	19310	Yssandon
