= Seilhac =

- Commune
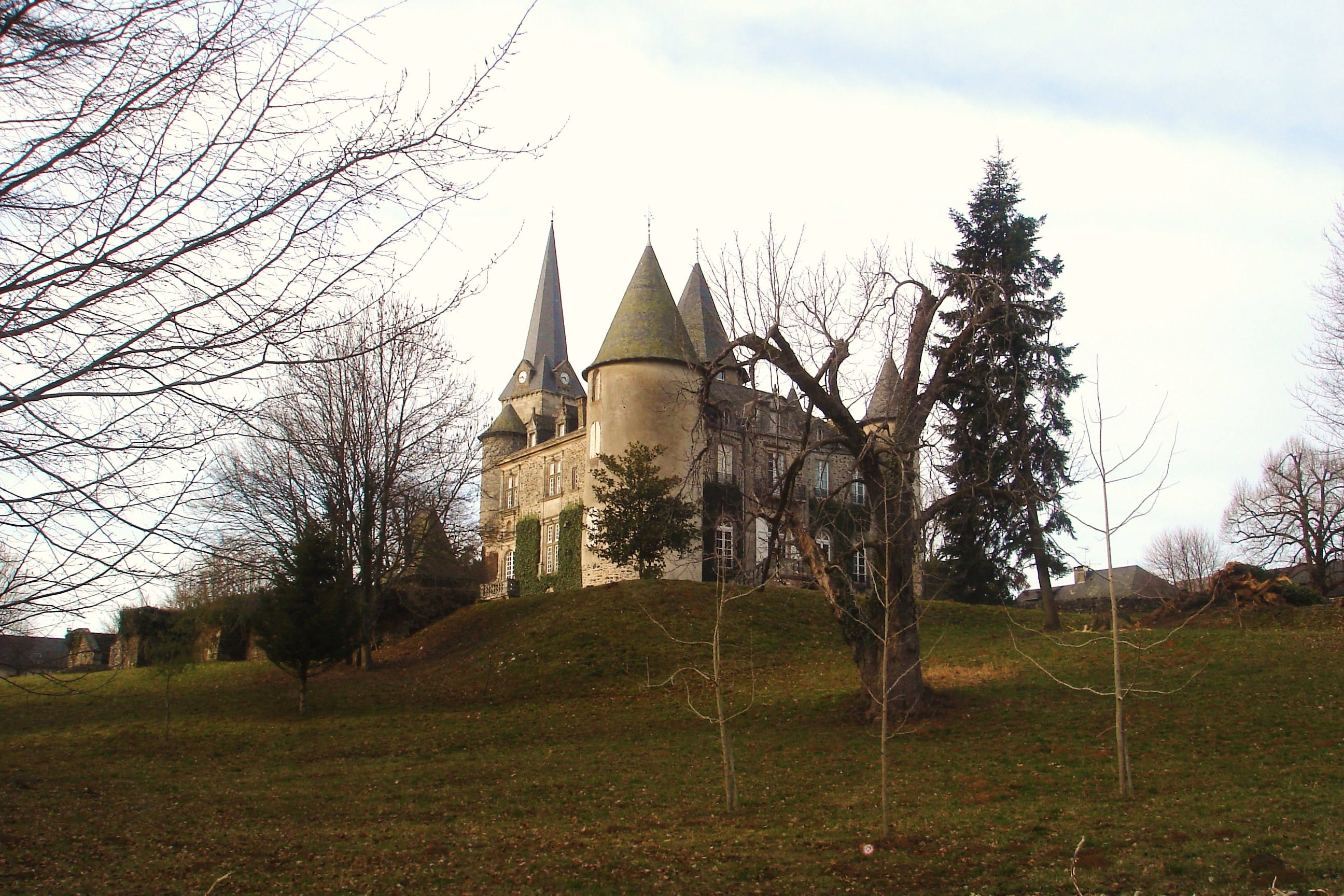
- Chateau

- Coat of arms
- Location of Seilhac
- Location within France Location within Nouvelle-Aquitaine
- Coordinates: 45°22′05″N 1°42′51″E
- Country: France
- Region: Nouvelle-Aquitaine
- Department: Corrèze
- Arrondissement: Tulle
- Canton: Seilhac-Monédières
- Intercommunality: CA Tulle Agglo

Government
  - Mayor (2024–2026): Simone Crouzette
- Area^{1}: 25.75 km^{2} (9.94 sq mi)
- Elevation: 500 m (1,600 ft)
- Highest elevation: 547 m (1,795 ft)
- Lowest elevation: 317 m (1,040 ft)
- Population (2023): 1,805
  - Density: 70.10/km^{2} (181.6/sq mi)
- Time zone: UTC+01:00 (CET)
  - Summer (DST): UTC+02:00 (CEST)
- INSEE/Postal code: 19255 /19700
- ^{1} French Land Register data, which excludes lakes, ponds, glaciers > 1 km^{2} (0.386 sq mi or 247 acres) and river estuaries.

Seilhac (French pronunciation: [sɛjak]; Occitan: Selhac) is a commune in the Corrèze department in central France in the Nouvelle-Aquitaine region.

== Geography ==
=== Location ===
Seilhac is located approximately equal distance from Tulle, Brive-la-Gaillarde and Uzerche. Close to the A89 and A20 motorways, the country of Seilhac represents a natural border between the Corrèze and the Vézère valleys. The communal territory is thus watered by the Brézou, a tributary of the Vézère, and by the Céronne, a tributary of the Corrèze river.

Located on the foothills of the Massif Central, the commune has a hilly terrain characterised by wooded hills and mini-plateau with average heights ranging from 420 to 547 metres in the Puy des Ferrières. The commune stretches over 2 575 hectares and on almost 7 km in the north-south direction and over 8 km in the east-west direction.

The climate, is of a semi-continental type, is characterised by a certain softness due to a southwest exposure.

The main urban area is located in the centre of the communal territory.

=== Population ===
Historical population
Year	Pop.	±% p.a.
1968	1,247	—
1975	1,319	+0.81%
1982	1,440	+1.26%
1990	1,540	+0.84%
1999	1,635	+0.67%
2007	1,750	+0.85%
2012	1,701	−0.57%
2017	1,737	+0.42%
2023	1,805	+0.64%
Source: INSEE

== History ==
Gallo-Roman vestiges testify to the presence on the territory of the commune. Seilhac is known from the 7th century.

The name 'Seilhac' comes from the association of the name of a man Sailus, owner of an agricultural estate, with the suffix of Gallic origin -acumen. The formation of the name of the municipality occurred before the 6th century. Its position at the crossroads of old pathways gave the village its boom.

In 1784, Turgot, then administrator of the Limousin, established the route linking Paris to the centre of France. Thanks to the influence of the Marquis de Seilhac, this road passed through the town of the same name. In 1790, the rank of the borough was confirmed and named as the capital of the canton.

On 10 June 1944, the Nazi German Das Reich Division, which had already the day before committed the Tulle massacre and committed on 10 June, the Oradour-sur-Glane massacre, made arrests in Seilhac and Masléon (Haute-Vienne). Four people from Seilhac are among the 2,152 deportees (all men, including 149 who had been arrested in Tulle on 9 June) from the Royallieu-Compiègne internment camp at Compiègne, transported on 2 July to the Dachau concentration camp on the notorious "Death train" (Transport no I.2400).

== Economy ==
The local economy is based on crafts and on SMEs. The agricultural sector is declining despite the persistence of an economy based on quality cattle breeding.

== Places and monuments ==
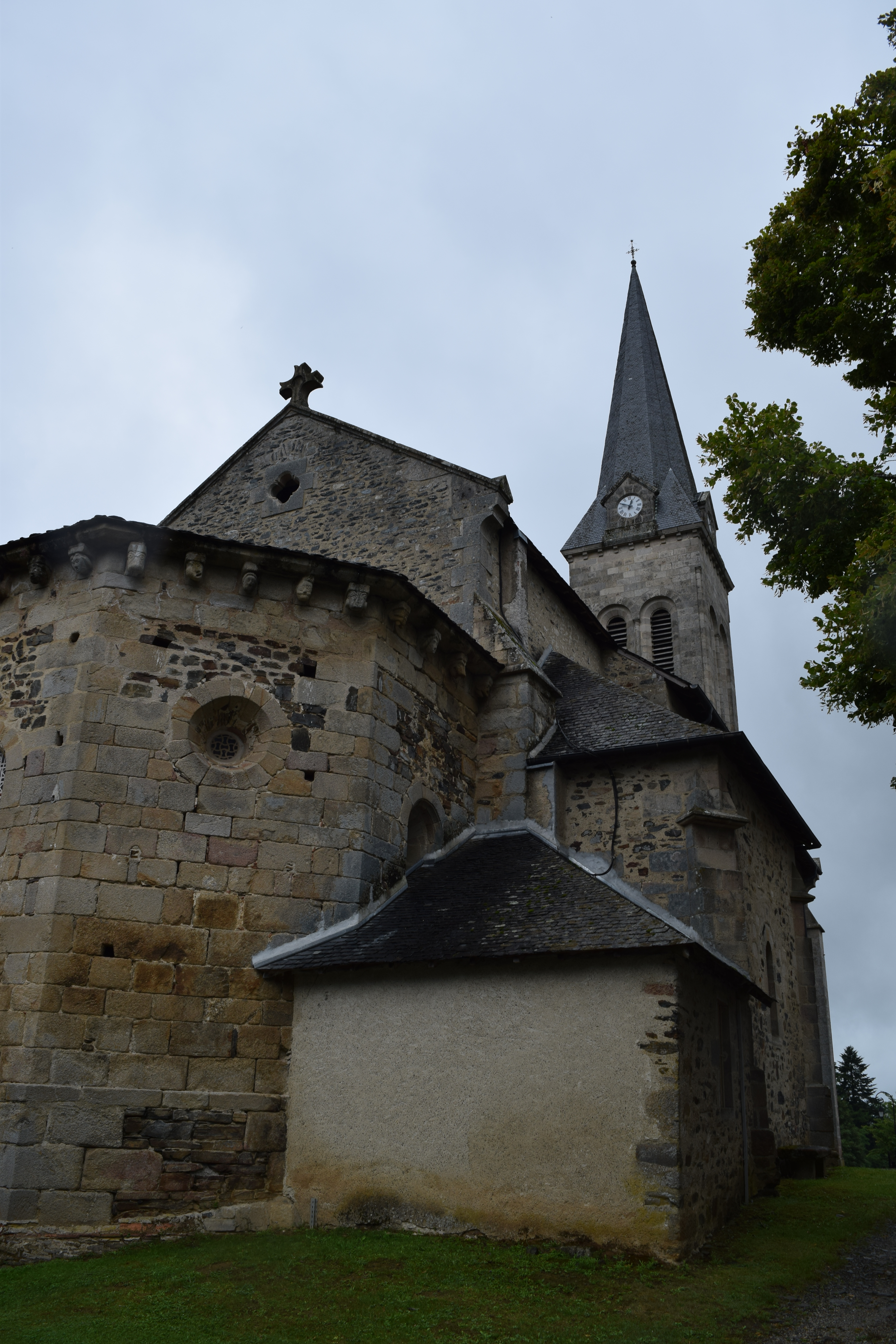
Church of Notre-Dame de Seilhac

The architectural heritage whose main elements are the church (apse and choir) and the chateau rebuilt at the end of the 19th century (now a private domain) constitutes the principal historical heritage of the commune. The church choir and the chateau garden have been added to the inventory of historic monuments.

The town also has a tourist facility at the Bournazel lake, a vast 35 hectares and the infrastructure for leisure and nature.

== Notable people ==
- Henry de Bournazel (1898–1933), Hero of the pacification of Morocco (l'homme à la tunique rouge). The Lespinasse family of Bournazel have been located in the communes of Saint-Jal and Seilhac since the 16th century.
- Leonard Leymarie (1880–1914), born in Seilhac, executed as an example by the army.

== Events ==
- Festival Théâtre à Seilhac

== See also ==
- Communes of the Corrèze department
