= Le Lonzac =

- Commune
- Coat of arms
- Location of Le Lonzac
- Location within France Location within Nouvelle-Aquitaine
- Coordinates: 45°27′53″N 1°43′46″E
- Country: France
- Region: Nouvelle-Aquitaine
- Department: Corrèze
- Arrondissement: Tulle
- Canton: Seilhac-Monédières
- Intercommunality: CA Tulle Agglo

Government
  - Mayor (2026–2032): Paul Barraquier
- Area^{1}: 35.97 km^{2} (13.89 sq mi)
- Highest elevation: 565 m (1,854 ft)
- Lowest elevation: 321 m (1,053 ft)
- Population (2023): 823
  - Density: 22.9/km^{2} (59.3/sq mi)
- Time zone: UTC+01:00 (CET)
  - Summer (DST): UTC+02:00 (CEST)
- INSEE/Postal code: 19118 /19470
- ^{1} French Land Register data, which excludes lakes, ponds, glaciers > 1 km^{2} (0.386 sq mi or 247 acres) and river estuaries.

Le Lonzac (French pronunciation: [lə lɔ̃zak]; Occitan: Olonsac) is a commune in the Corrèze department in central France.

== Population ==
Historical population
Year	Pop.	±% p.a.
1968	1,084	—
1975	992	−1.26%
1982	929	−0.93%
1990	855	−1.03%
1999	772	−1.13%
2007	811	+0.62%
2012	775	−0.90%
2017	805	+0.76%
2023	823	+0.37%
Source: INSEE

== See also ==
- Communes of the Corrèze department
