= Saint-Clément, Corrèze =

Saint-Clément
- Commune
- Coat of arms
- Location of Saint-Clément
- Location within France Location within Nouvelle-Aquitaine
- Coordinates: 45°20′33″N 1°41′09″E
- Country: France
- Region: Nouvelle-Aquitaine
- Department: Corrèze
- Arrondissement: Tulle
- Canton: Seilhac-Monédières
- Intercommunality: CA Tulle Agglo

Government
  - Mayor (2020–2026): Éric Bellouin
- Area^{1}: 26.56 km^{2} (10.25 sq mi)
- Elevation: 460 m (1,510 ft)
- Highest elevation: 547 m (1,795 ft)
- Lowest elevation: 353 m (1,158 ft)
- Population (2023): 1,386
  - Density: 52.18/km^{2} (135.2/sq mi)
- Time zone: UTC+01:00 (CET)
  - Summer (DST): UTC+02:00 (CEST)
- INSEE/Postal code: 19194 /19700
- ^{1} French Land Register data, which excludes lakes, ponds, glaciers > 1 km^{2} (0.386 sq mi or 247 acres) and river estuaries.

Saint-Clément (French pronunciation: [sɛ̃ klemɑ̃]; Limousin: Sent Clement) is a commune in the Corrèze department in central France.

== Population ==
Historical population
Year	Pop.	±% p.a.
1968	945	—
1975	853	−1.45%
1982	877	+0.40%
1990	908	+0.44%
1999	1,011	+1.20%
2007	1,204	+2.21%
2012	1,318	+1.83%
2017	1,323	+0.08%
2023	1,386	+0.78%
Source: INSEE

== See also ==
- Communes of the Corrèze department
