= Chanteix =

- Commune
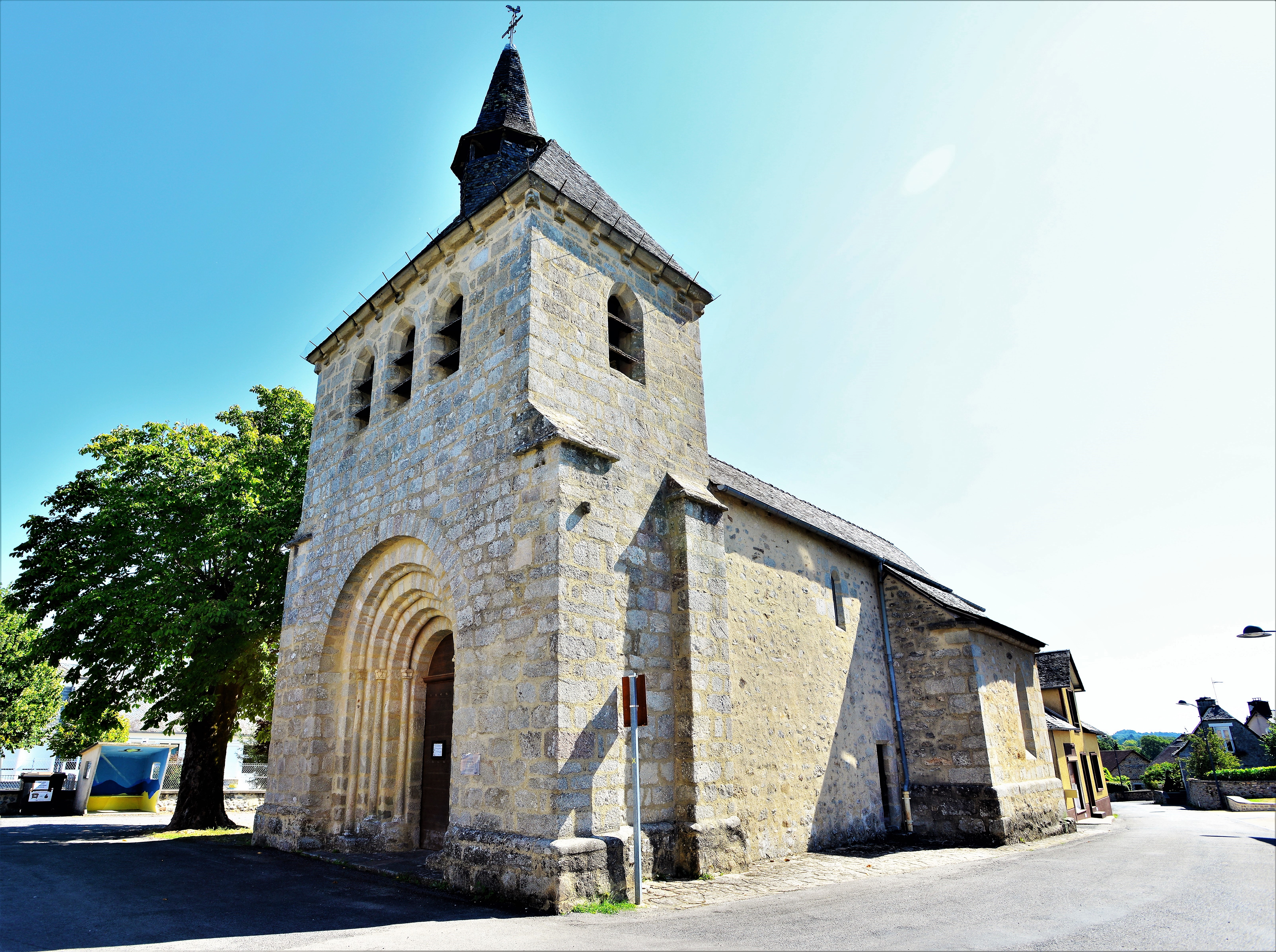
- Saint-Michel church in Chanteix

- Coat of arms
- Location of Chanteix
- Location within France Location within Nouvelle-Aquitaine
- Coordinates: 45°18′38″N 1°38′18″E
- Country: France
- Region: Nouvelle-Aquitaine
- Department: Corrèze
- Arrondissement: Tulle
- Canton: Seilhac-Monédières
- Intercommunality: CA Tulle Agglo

Government
  - Mayor (2020–2026): Jean Mouzat
- Area^{1}: 19.47 km^{2} (7.52 sq mi)
- Elevation: 380 m (1,250 ft)
- Highest elevation: 451 m (1,480 ft)
- Lowest elevation: 312 m (1,024 ft)
- Population (2023): 596
  - Density: 30.6/km^{2} (79.3/sq mi)
- Time zone: UTC+01:00 (CET)
  - Summer (DST): UTC+02:00 (CEST)
- INSEE/Postal code: 19042 /19330
- ^{1} French Land Register data, which excludes lakes, ponds, glaciers > 1 km^{2} (0.386 sq mi or 247 acres) and river estuaries.

Chanteix (French pronunciation: [ʃɑ̃tɛks]; Occitan: Chantau) is a commune in the Corrèze department in central France.

== Population ==
Historical population
Year	Pop.	±% p.a.
1968	642	—
1975	565	−1.81%
1982	520	−1.18%
1990	520	+0.00%
1999	517	−0.06%
2007	559	+0.98%
2012	580	+0.74%
2017	610	+1.01%
2023	596	−0.39%
Source: INSEE

== See also ==
- Communes of the Corrèze department
