= Treignac =

French commune in the Corrèze Department

- Commune
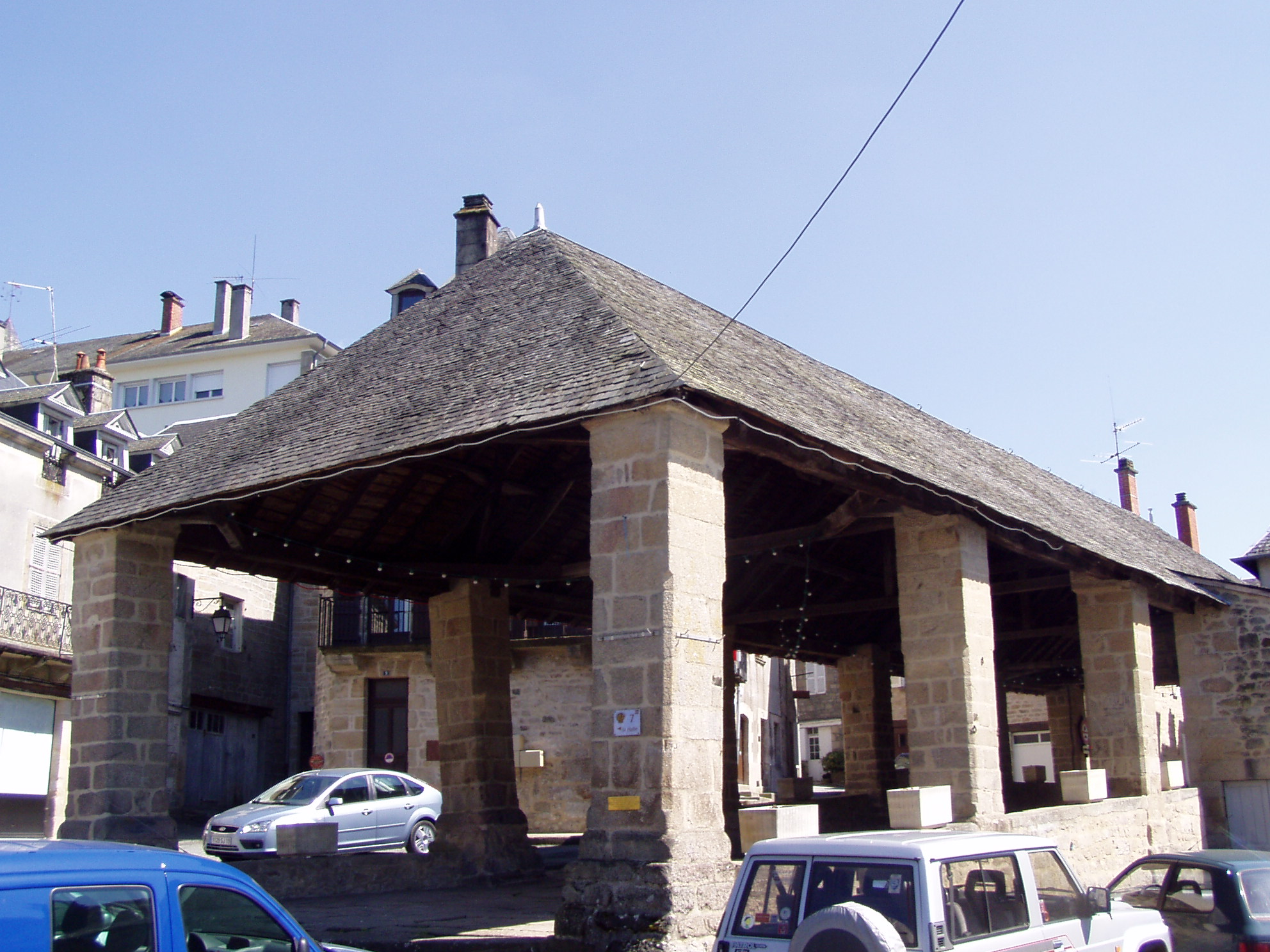
- Old market

- Coat of arms
- Location of Treignac
- Location within France Location within Nouvelle-Aquitaine
- Coordinates: 45°32′15″N 1°47′46″E
- Country: France
- Region: Nouvelle-Aquitaine
- Department: Corrèze
- Arrondissement: Tulle
- Canton: Seilhac-Monédières

Government
  - Mayor (2026–32): Alexia Legrain
- Area^{1}: 36.73 km^{2} (14.18 sq mi)
- Elevation: 482 m (1,581 ft)
- Highest elevation: 765 m (2,510 ft)
- Lowest elevation: 375 m (1,230 ft)
- Population (2023): 1,256
  - Density: 34.20/km^{2} (88.57/sq mi)
- Time zone: UTC+01:00 (CET)
  - Summer (DST): UTC+02:00 (CEST)
- INSEE/Postal code: 19269 /19260
- ^{1} French Land Register data, which excludes lakes, ponds, glaciers > 1 km^{2} (0.386 sq mi or 247 acres) and river estuaries.

Treignac (French pronunciation: [tʁɛɲak]; Occitan: Trainhac) is a commune in the Corrèze department in central France. Treignac, designated one of the 'most beautiful villages of France', is a most typically French town retaining much of its medieval character, situated on the banks of the Vézère river on one of the pilgrimage routes to Santiago de Compostela, the burial place of St James the Apostle along the way known as the Via Lemovicensis and crosses the 13th-century bridge over the river. During the Hundred Years' War, it was pillaged by Rodrigo de Villandrando.

== Toponymy ==
Treignac is mentioned in the Latin forms Trainiaco (in 924) and Trainiaci (around 1092), respectively in the ablative and genitive, then in 1105 in the Occitan form Trayniac. According to Marcel Villoutreix, it is a derivative of the Latin personal name Traianius with the Gallic suffix -acus.

== History ==
Founded around 800 AD, its first chateau or castle was built around the year 1000 on an inaccessible rock outcrop on a loop of the Vezere. The Chateau was the stronghold of the lands of the Medieval dynasty the Viscounty of Comborn, who had as its first head the man known as Archambaud, the butcher, as result of his cruel rule, then later Jambe pourrie (Rotten leg), because of a damaged leg. A small village developed next to the castle and a church, Église Notre-Dame-des-Bancs, built.

As the village on rock outcrop could not expand any further, a new village was built on the site of the current town. At the same time the city walls were commenced of which the Chabirande gate of the 13th century still survives but the ramparts were destroyed at the start of the 19th century.

One kilometre from Treignac, on the high point now called Les églises, not far from the fountain of Saint Méen, was the starting point of a religious settlement, It consisted of three churches; Saint-Martin, Saint-Léobon and Saint-Jean, destroyed in a fire in 1740. The Church of Saint Martin was attached to the monastery at Uzerche. During the High Middle Ages, there were two main places in the current territory of the commune of Treignac: Manzannes and Treignac. In Manzannes, a priory was established, dedicated to the Notre Dame, attached to the monastery of Ventadour (Order of Cluny).

Treignac was a free city following three charters: 1205, 1284 and in 1438, the town was governed by four consuls.

The town has been sacked by armies more than once, most notably by Rodrigue de Villandrando during the Hundred Year's War and later during the French Wars of Religion in the 16th century. During the religious wars, the town was strongly protestant and built three churches for the faith, though none now exist.

Although rebuilding had started during the Renaissance much of the town dates from the 17th, 18th and 19th centuries whilst also preserving its medieval charm.

Before the Revolution it was known as Treignac la Montagne but at the time of Convention or the French Revolutionary Government of 1792/95 it was renamed Treignac.

In more modern times the Pont Finot bridge was built in 1824 and the Bargy bridge in 1840. In the 1900s, new streets were opened. On 20 July 1904, the PO-Corrèze railway line from Seihac to Treignac was built in 1904 but closed in 1970.

== Geography ==
=== Location ===
Treignac is a commune located in the Massif Central on the Plateau de Millevaches. The village is built between 400 and 500 metres above sea level, at the foot of the Massif des Monédières, in the gorges of the Vézère river, at the edge of the Parc naturel régional de Millevaches en Limousin (Regional Natural Park of Millevaches in Limousin). The site is limited to the west by the Rocher des Folles and to the east by the Saut de la Virolle.

=== Hydrography ===
The waters of the Vézère are retained upstream of the village by the Barrage de Treignac (dam), forming the lac des Bariousses (lake). The commune is also watered by a tributary of the Vézère, the Alambre, and the stream called Ruisseau de la Cassière, a tributary of the Soudaine, itself a tributary of the Vézère.

=== Climate ===
Influenced by an Atlantic oceanic climate, it gives rise to a very green natural vegetation.

== Population ==
Historical population
| Year | Pop. | ±% p.a. |
|---|---|---|
| 1968 | 1,826 | — |
| 1975 | 1,866 | +0.31% |
| 1982 | 1,690 | −1.41% |
| 1990 | 1,520 | −1.32% |
| 1999 | 1,415 | −0.79% |
| 2007 | 1,384 | −0.28% |
| 2012 | 1,395 | +0.16% |
| 2017 | 1,361 | −0.49% |
| 2023 | 1,256 | −1.33% |
Source: INSEE

== Local culture and heritage ==
=== Places and monuments ===
==== Religious heritage ====
- Église Notre-Dame-des-Bancs – the current church, in the Gothic style of 13th-century. Notre-Dame-de-la-Basse-Cour was the first church, located at the castle. That name was abandoned in favour of Notre-Dame-des-Bancs. This church was renovated and enlarged in 1471 by the Pompadour's. The bell tower was rebuilt in 1602 and a Louis XIII-style door. The aisles and nave are at the same height, with a ribbed vaults supported by short columns. The building was listed as a historical monument in 1932.
- Chapelle Saint-Jean-Baptiste des Pénitents Blancs – the chapel was built with the help of subscriptions. The first stone was laid in 1646 and was completed by 1661. It was damaged in the French Revolution and repaired in 1807, while the bell-tower was built in 1820. The high altar is from 1676 by Mouret of Tulle and the painting from 1685 by Mazoyer. This place of worship received the brotherhood of the White Penitents founded in 1637. At the beginning of 20th-century, the brotherhood became extinct when the last penitent died. Listed as a National Monument in 1932.
- Chapelle Notre-Dame-de-la-Paix – the chapel was built in 1626 under the auspices of the lord of the place, Philibert de Pompadour, the money having been donated by the lawyer Jean Dumas, and dedicated to Our Lady of Peace. It became the town hall from 1808 until 1987; it is now used as a meeting room for the municipal council and an exhibition room, Salle Paul-Pouloux (Paul-Pouloux room). It has a twisted bell tower, which is a fairly rare form of bell tower in Europe (there are only about a hundred in all of Europe). One of the most complex of all the twisted bell towers in France, it was built deliberately in this way.
- Remains of an old fortified church.
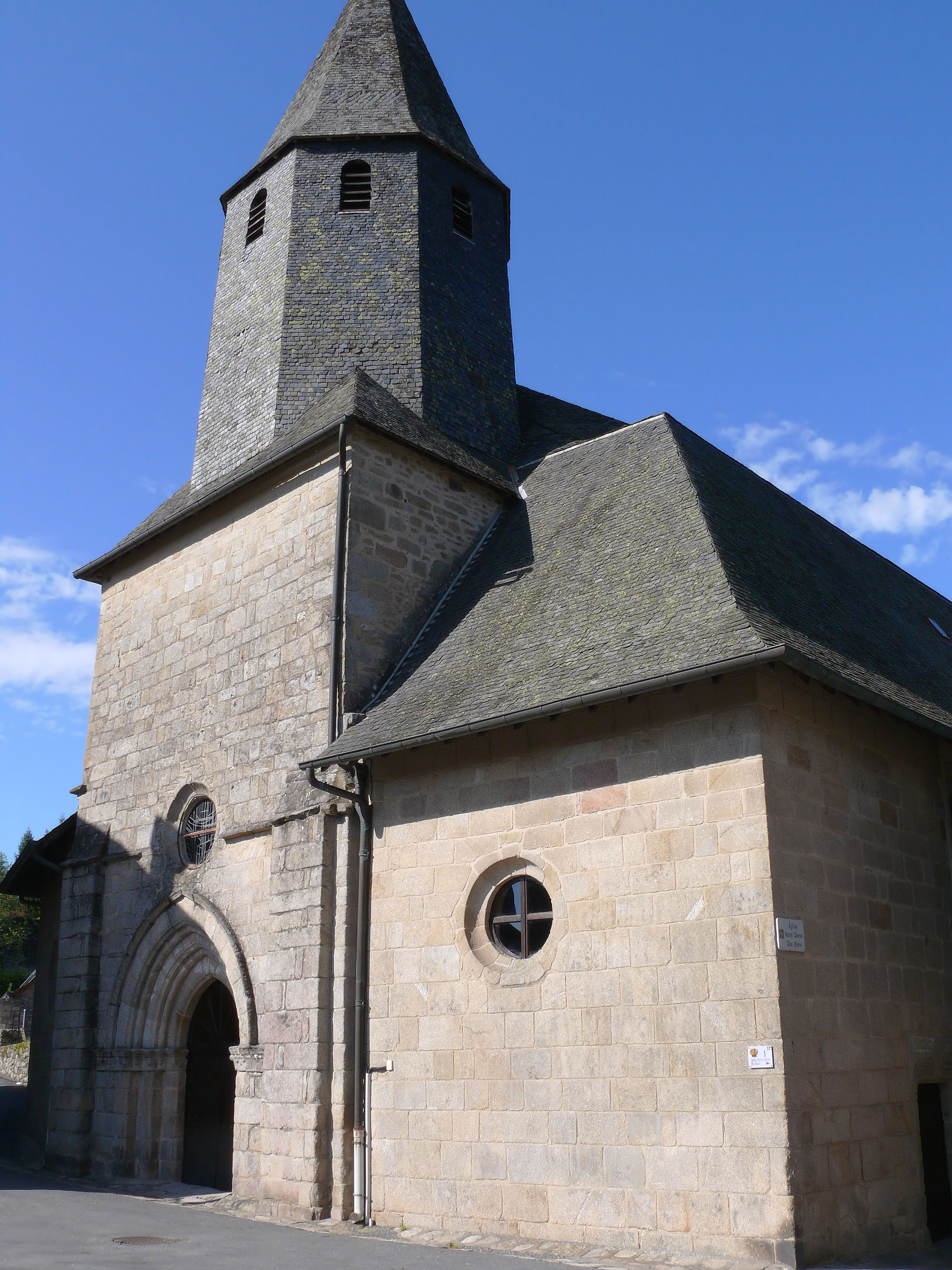
The church of Notre-Dame-des-Bans.

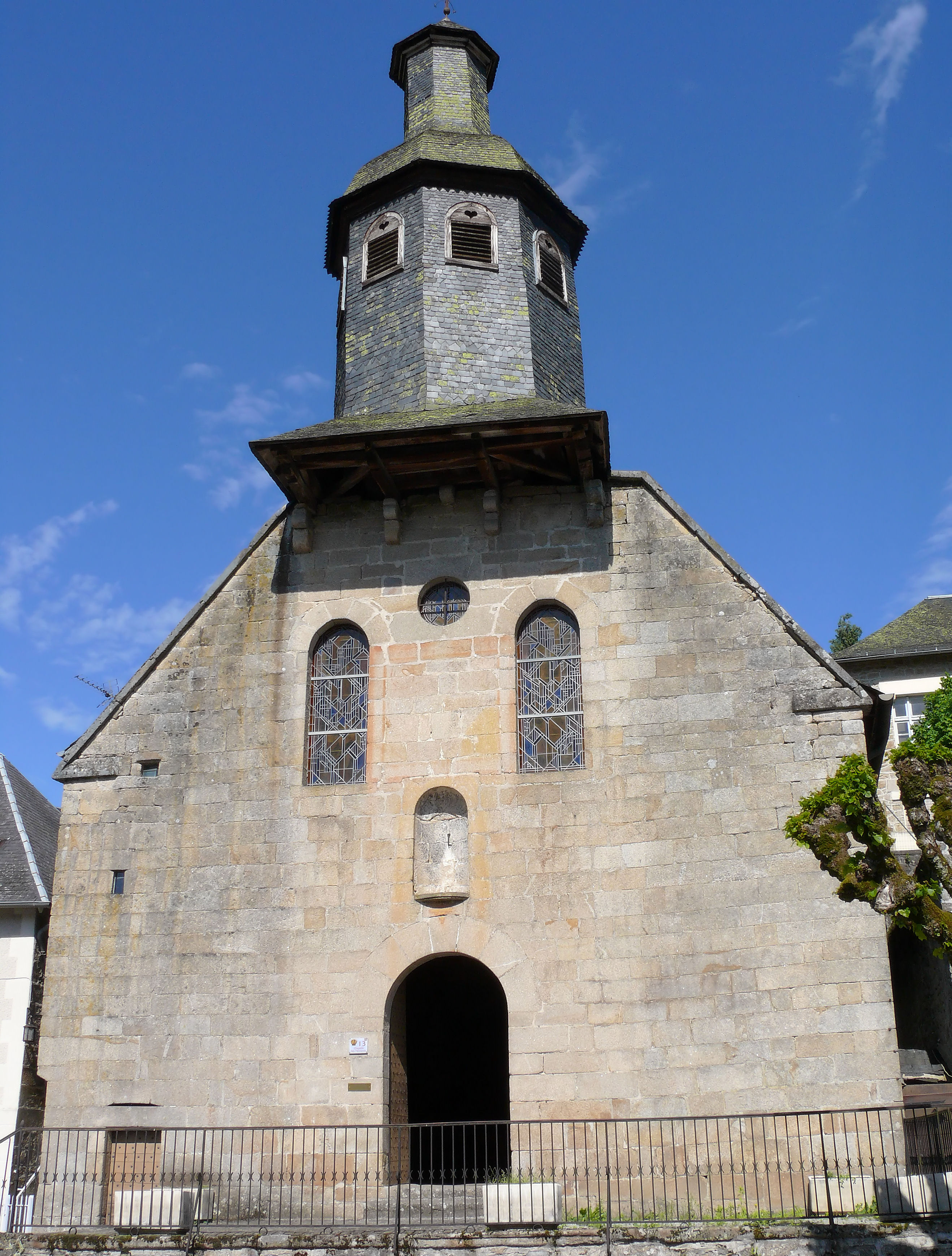
Chapel of Saint-Jean-Baptiste des Pénitents Blancs.

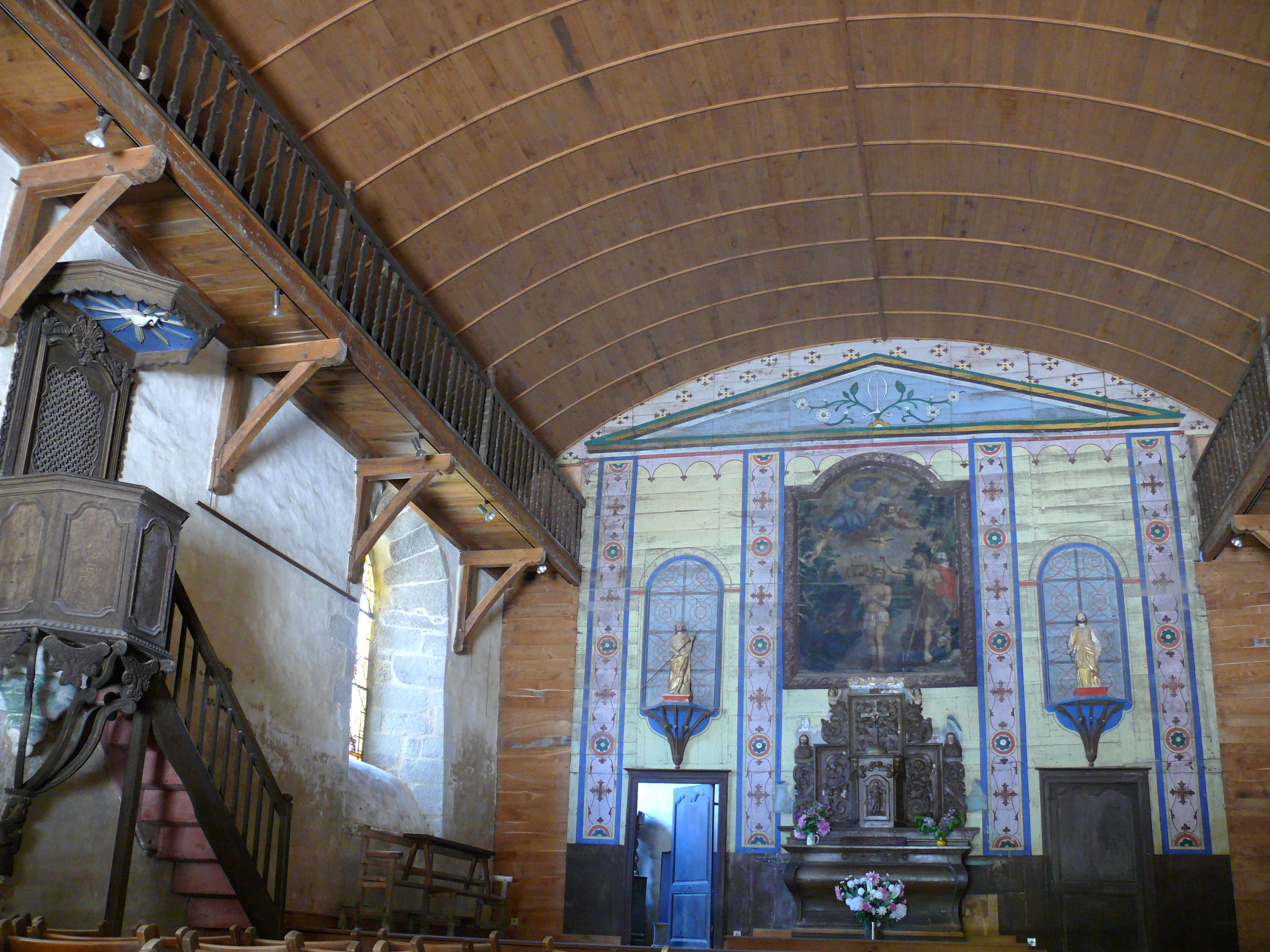
Interior of the Chapel of Saint-Jean-Baptiste des Pénitents Blancs.

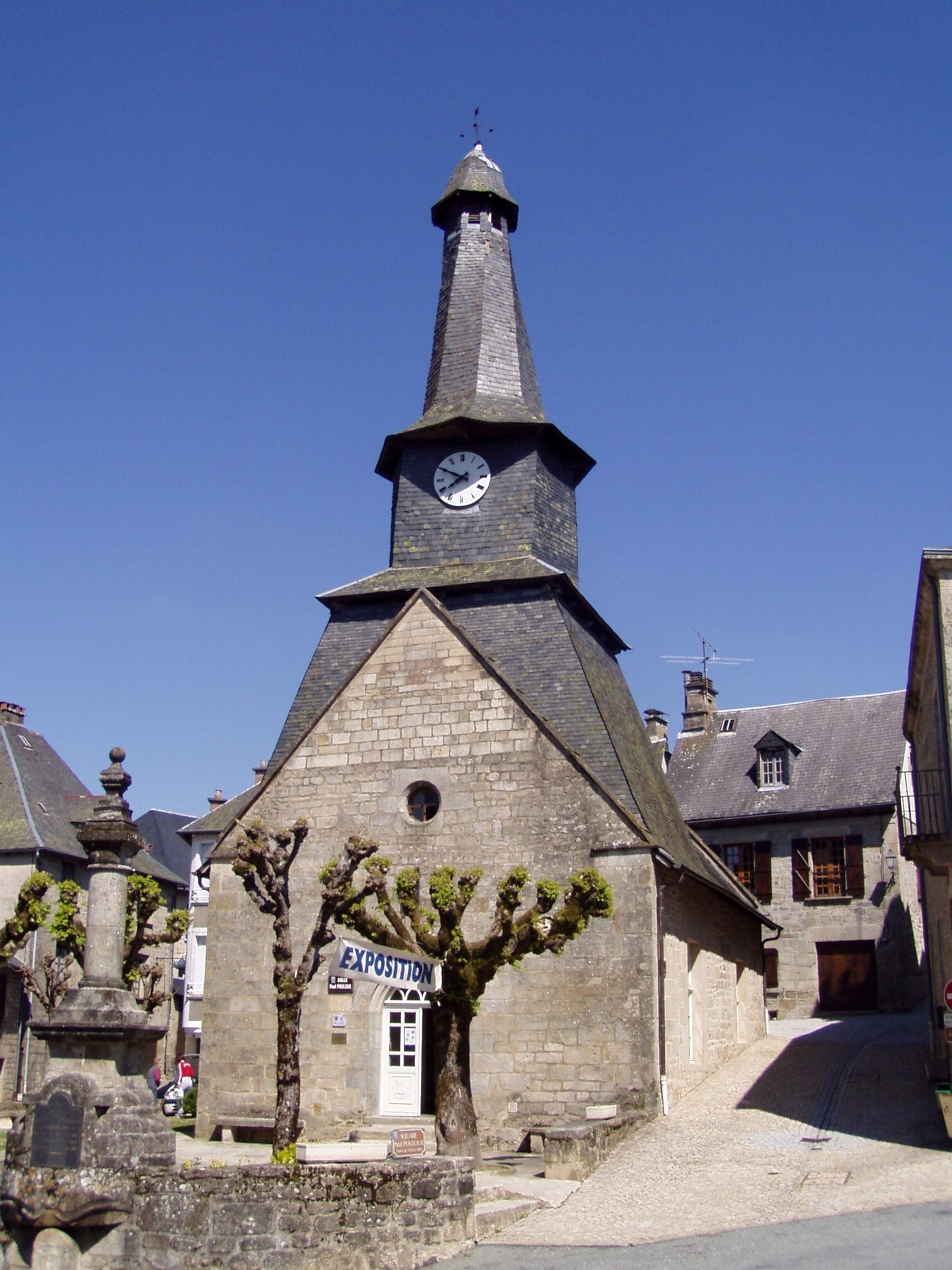
Notre-Dame-de-la-Paix chapel with its twisted bell tower.

==== Castles and manors ====
- Château de Treignac – was the property of the Comborn's, but became the property of the Pompadour's in the 16th-century, then later the Hautefort and Boisse families. Established as a prison during the French Revolution it was demolished in 1794.
- Château d'Auliat.
- Château de Coudert.
- Château de la Veyrière.
- Manoir de Boisse.
- Manoir de Grand-Champ.
- Manoir du Monteil.

==== Civil buildings ====
- Porte Chabirande – a town gate built in the 13th-century at the beginning of the walled city. Passing through it, on the left is the house of the guards who watched over this door. It connects the town with the Bans district. It is the only medieval gate in the town that still remains, the other two, the Porte de la Pradelle and the Porte Soulanche, have been destroyed.
- Maison Lachaud Sangnier (1573) – an inn located on the pilgrimage route of the Camino de Santiago. Inside is engraved the following sentence: Custodiat Dominus which reads "In the Guard of God". The lawyer, Charles Lachaud, was born there, who married Louise Ancelot, goddaughter of Alfred de Vigny. Their grandson, Marc Sangnier, stayed there.
- Market hall – built in the 13th-century, renovated in 1484 after the destruction by Rodrigue de Villandrando in 1438 during the Hundred Years' War. The framework is made of chestnut wood and is covered with Travassac slates. It originally rested on 14 dressed stone pillars.
- Hôtel Forest-de-Faye – Only the tower remains, stone with a spiral staircase dating from 1585. An accolade decoration frames the entrance door. It is written Trina Ostia, Trina Castella, Trina Suburbia (which means Three Gates, Three Castles, Three Suburbs). House destroyed in 1960 and replaced with the post office.
- Collège Lakanal – college founded in 1662 thanks to the donations of Étienne Lafond, Sieur du Mazubert, and his son Ignace. It was the doctrinal brothers of Ussel who were the first to teach in this college. Joseph Lakanal is said to have taught there in 1780. During the French Revolution it was a factory making saltpetre and then returned to being a public school in 1817.
- Fountain – in the square overlooking the college is a fountain dating from 1848.
- La Rue de la Garde – named so because it guarded the gates of La Pradelle and Soulanche, at the exit of the Rue du docteur Flessac (formerly Rue du Plaud), there are residences dating from the 15th-century, in particular the Maison Lavareille-Raynaud house.
- Maison Fleyssac – house built in the 15th-century. It leaned against the ramparts and buttresses of the Porte de la Pradelle. Sold to the Protestants in 1638, they celebrated their worship there for 50 years. In the 1960-1970, at the request of Father Georges Fleyssac, parish priest of the parish church of Saint-Sernin in Brive, on the first floor, a partition hiding a fireplace was demolished, which led to the discovery of an inscription on the mantelpiece, identified by a scholar as a text of the protestant cult.
- Musée des Arts et Traditions de la Haute-Vézère – a renaissance house, donated by the Lachaud family to the commune of Treignac, it is characterized by two large pointed doors and mullioned windows whose frames end in sculpted heads.
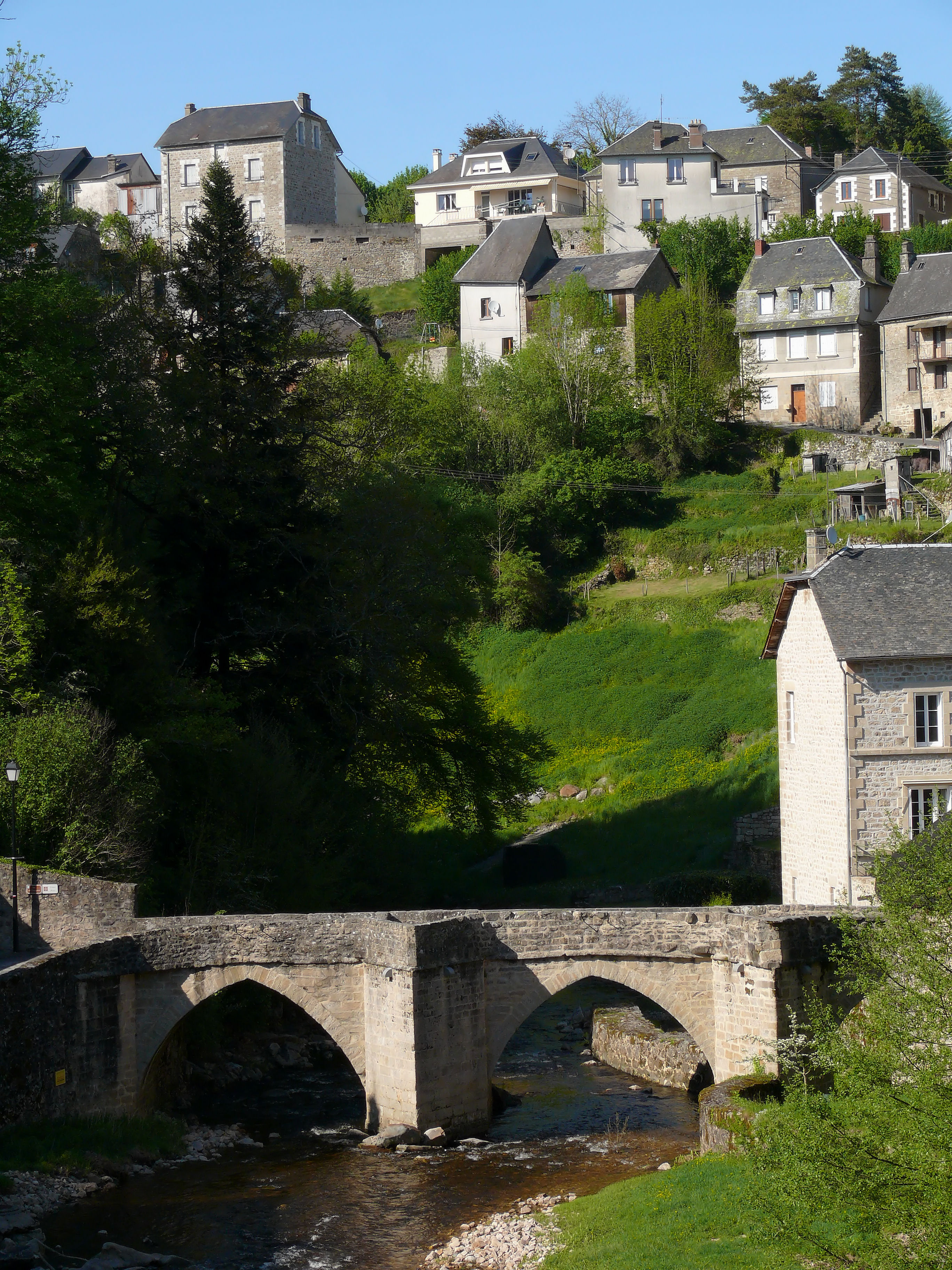
The bridge over the Vézère.

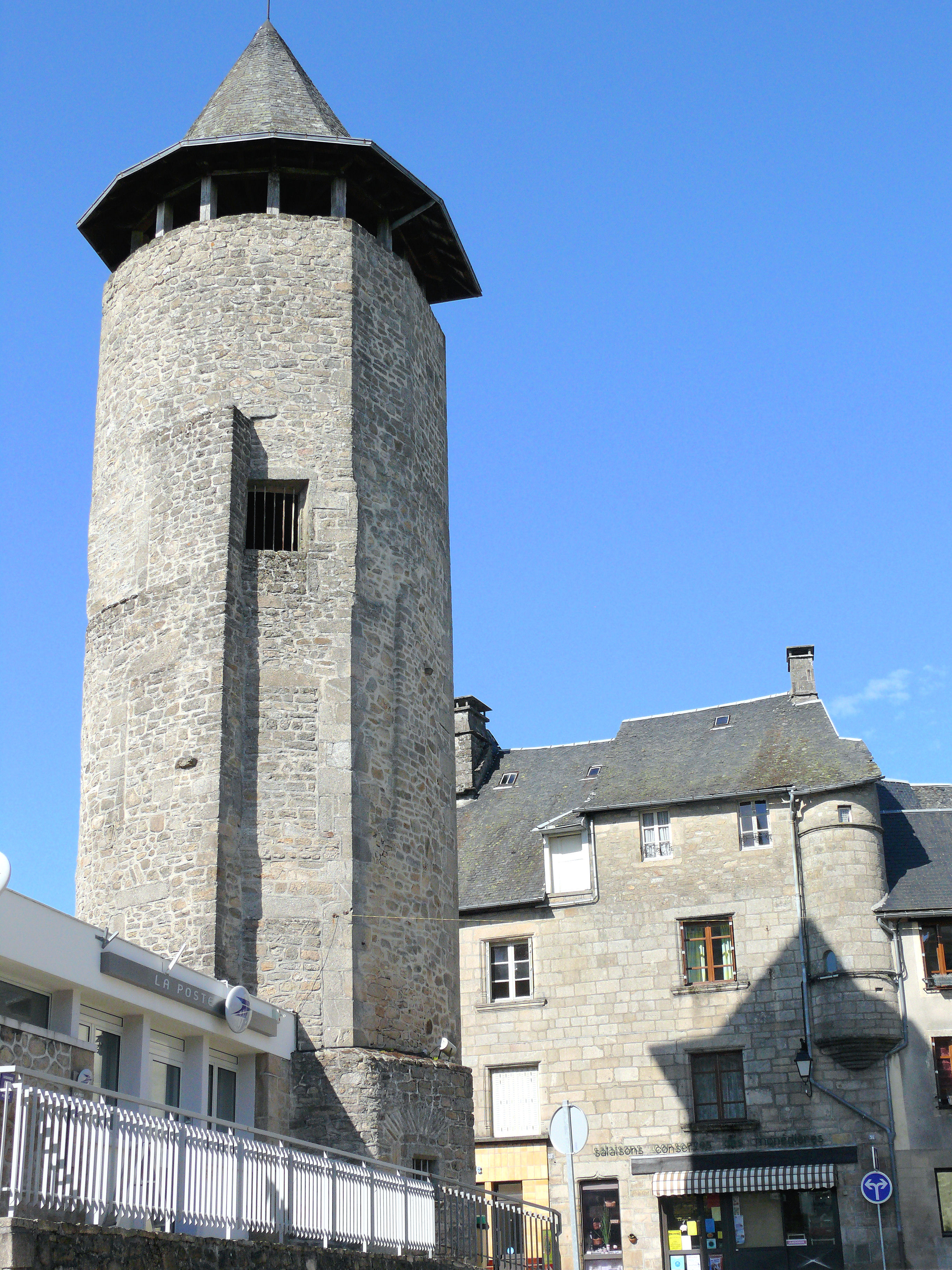
The tower.

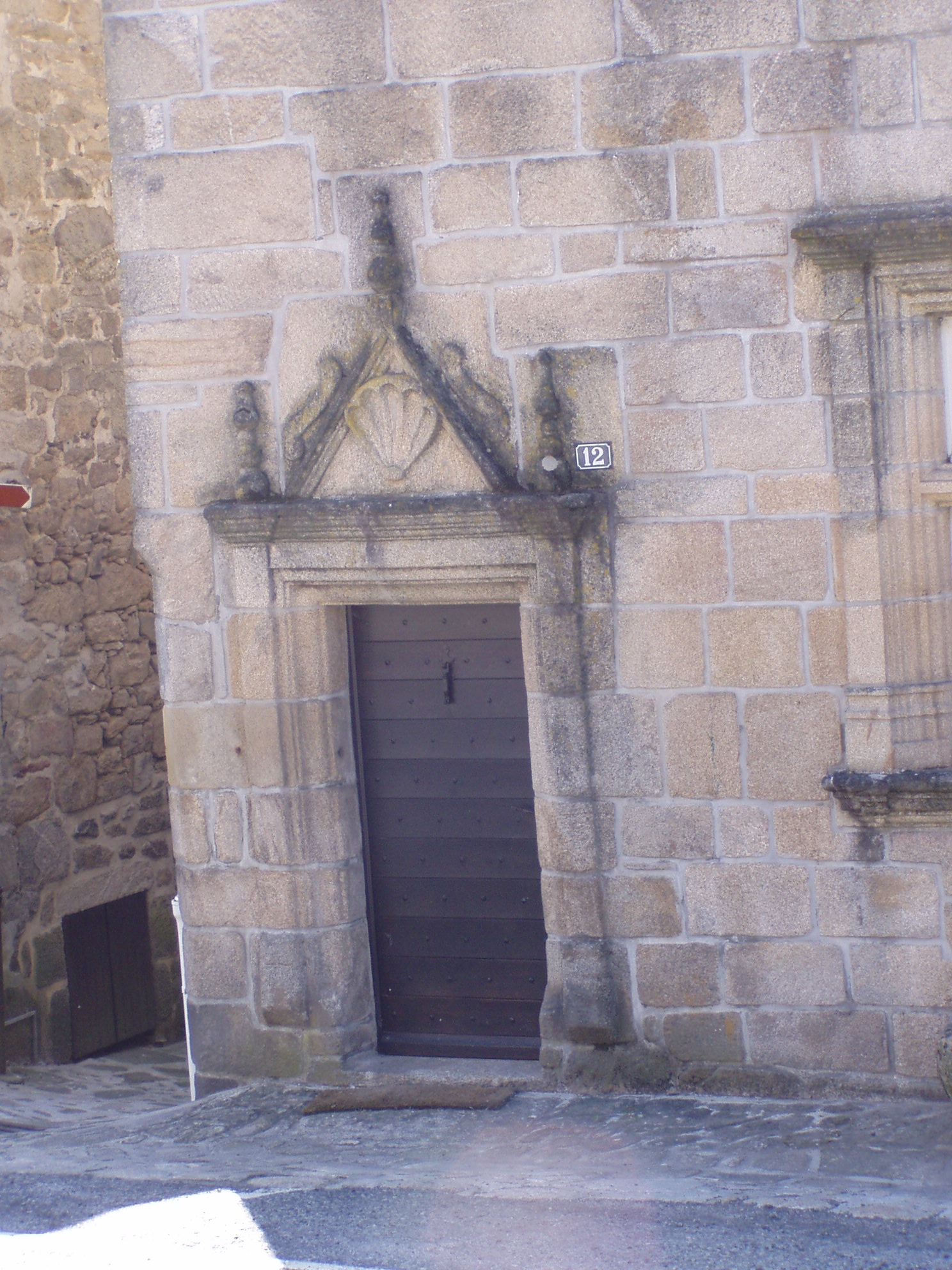
Detail of the door of the Maison Lachaud Sangnier.

Maison Fleyssac .

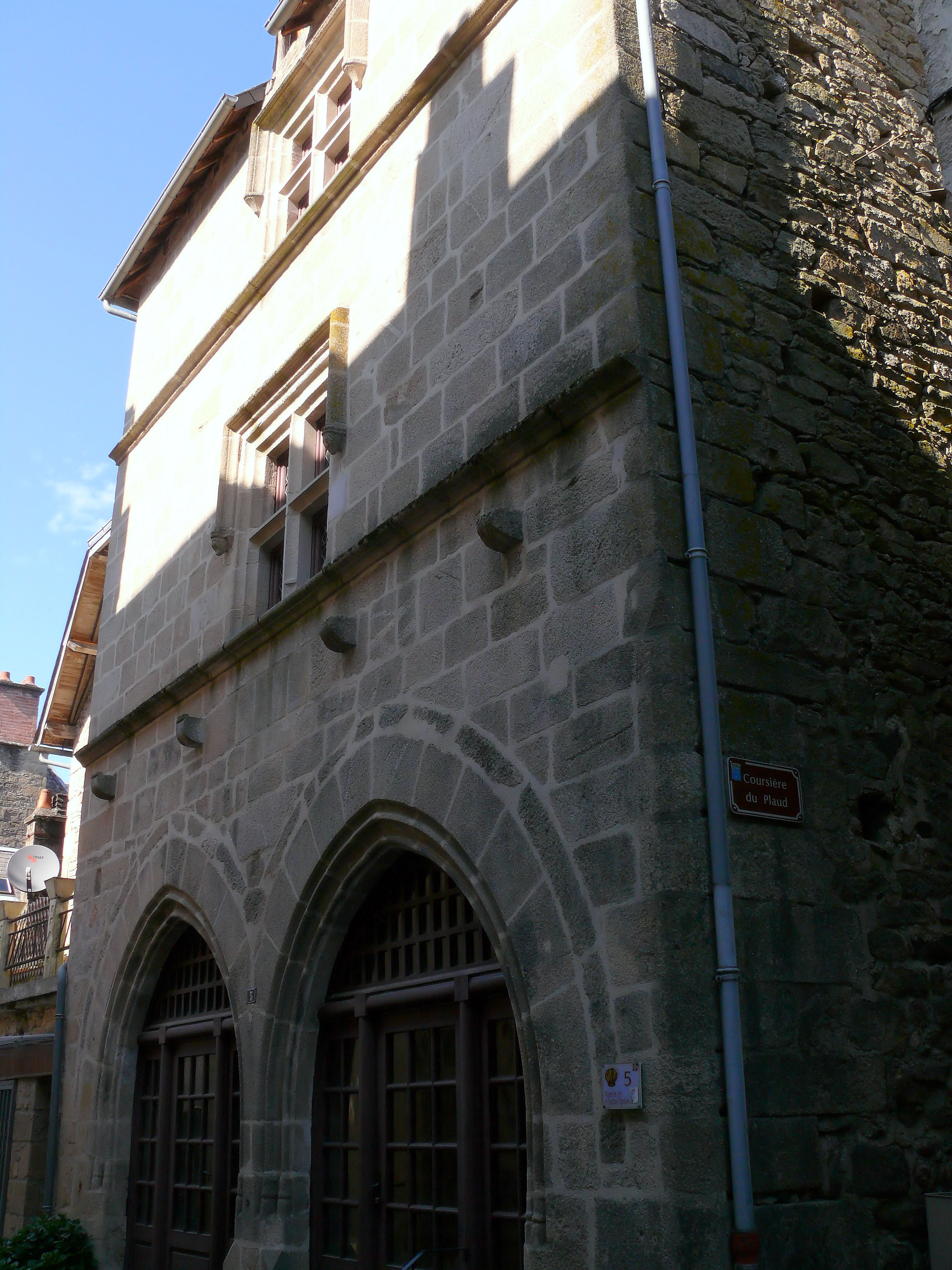
Museum of Arts and Traditions of Haute-Vézère.

==== Monuments ====
- War Memorial
- Statues - In 2020, two statues of former presidents of the France, Jacques Chirac and François Hollande, designed by the Argentine sculptor Augusto Daniel Gallo, were inaugurated near the Pont Finot. They remained in place for a few months.
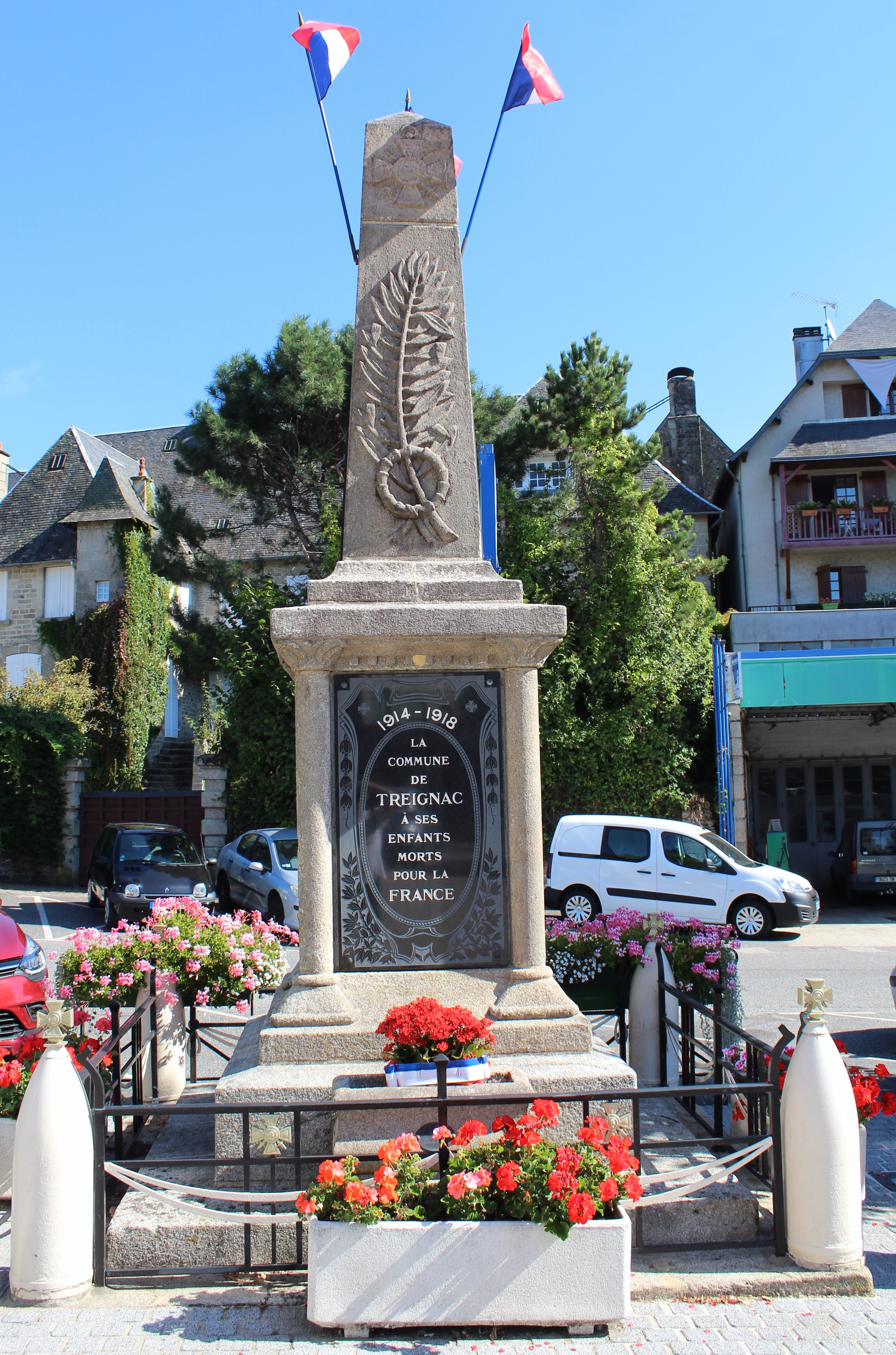
Le monument aux morts.

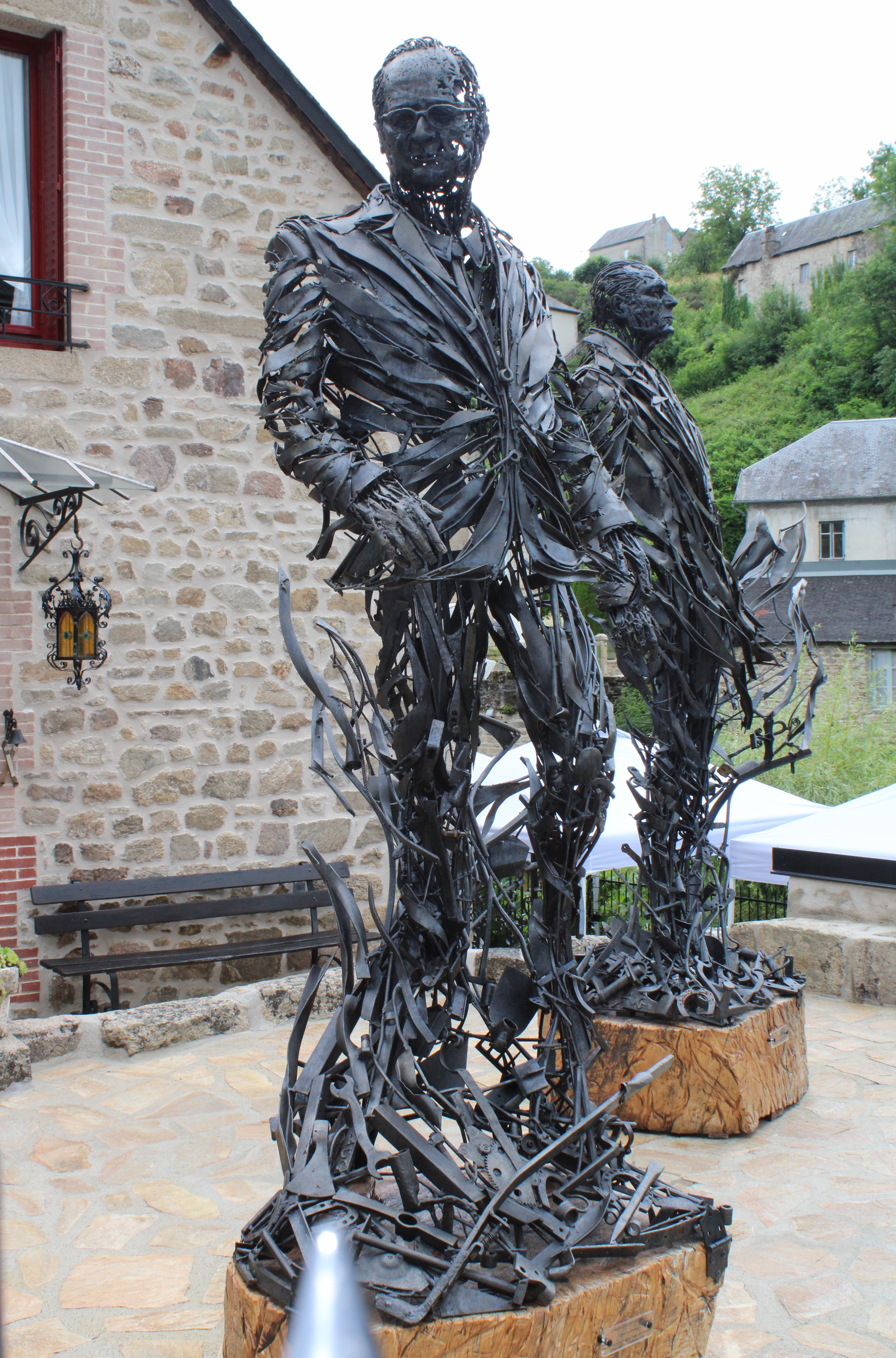
Sculptures of Hollande and Chirac.

== Notable people ==
- Pierre Rodier (born in Treignac around the middle of 13th-century, died in 1330) – Chancellor of France under Charles IV the Fair and then bishop of Carcassonne. He almost had a collegiate church built in Treignac.
- Jean-Joseph Parel Despeyrut de La Chatonie (1 January 1755 – 16 July 1843) – was a French politician.
- Jacques Juge de La Borie (1702-1779) - lawyer of King Louis XVI at the Presidial, first mayor of Limoges, born in Treignac.
- Charles Lachaud (1817–1882) – Bonapartist lawyer. A monument was erected in his honour on the Place de la République in 1897.
- Léon Vacher (1832-1903) – politician born and died in Treignac.
- Edmond Tapissier (1861-1943) – painter, cardboard maker, lithographer and illustrator, died in Treignac.
- Marc Sangnier (1873-1950) – journalist and politician, son of Félix Sangnier and Thérèse Lachaud, daughter of Charles Lachaud.
- Léon Salagnac (1894–1964) – French politician, member of the French Communist Party
- Camille Fleury (1914-1984) – painter, sculptor, stained glass artist (creator of the church's stained glass windows) and tapestry designer, died in Treignac.
- Pierre Meyrat (1916-1969) – French racing driver on circuits, buried there in Treignac.
- Jean Alambre (born 1946) – writer and songwriter, his pseudonym is a borrowed from the river of the same name, the Alambre.
- Bernard La Jarrige (1917–1999) – French actor

== See also ==
- Communes of the Corrèze department
