= Massif des Monédières =

Highland region in southern France

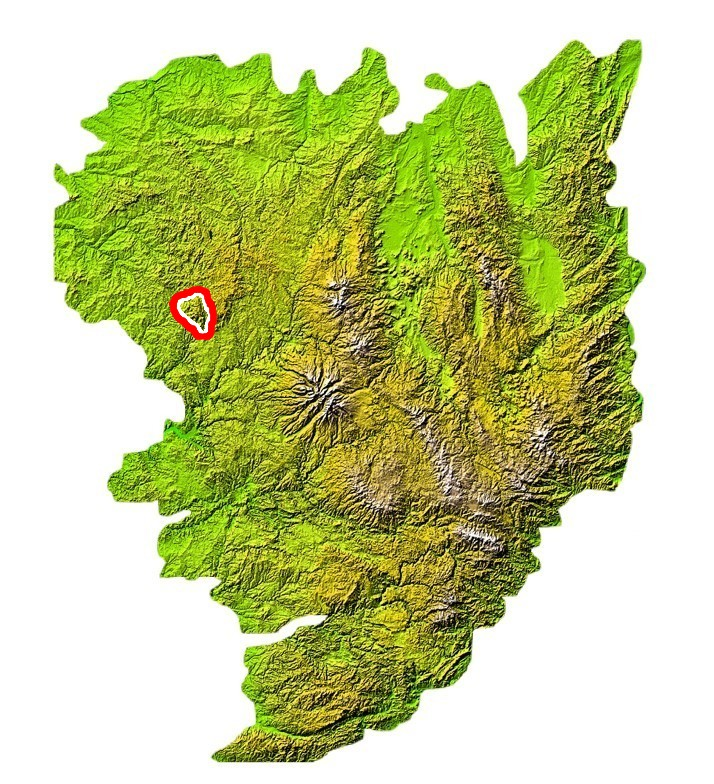

Highest point
- Peak: Puy de la Monédière
- Elevation: 922 m (3,025 ft)
- Coordinates: 45°29′05″N 1°50′23″E

Naming
- Native name: Las Monedieras (Occitan)

Geography
- Country: France
- Regions: Nouvelle-Aquitaine; Bourgogne-Franche-Comté; Nouvelle-Aquitaine; Occitania
- Range coordinates: 46°28′17″N 1°50′32″E

The Massif des Monédières is a granite highland region that is part of the Massif Central and is included in the department of Corrèze.

It is located in the south-west of the Plateau de Millevaches.

A large part of the Massif des Monédières is classified as a Natura 2000 zone. Its highest peak is the Puy de la Monédière which rises to 922 meters and gave its name to the massif.

== Toponymy ==
The name Monédières would mean "mountains of the day", an etymology that Pierre Monteil disputes.

It is called Las Monedieras in Occitan. It is a set of small mountains characteristic of the Massif Central, whose rounded peaks have different names such as puy, puech, suc.

== Geography ==
=== Location ===
Dominating the Corrèze part of the Plateau du Limousin by more than 500 metres, the Monédières constitute one of the most marked reliefs of the Monts du Limousin, presenting an imposing contrast by its suddenness, offering a view of several tens of kilometres towards the west. This rupture is reinforced and caused by the geological differences between the massif (granitoid) and the plateau (gneiss).

The cirque configuration (Freysselines and Veix), with very steep reliefs, constitutes a rare landscape in Limousin. The Pradines fault to the east and the Treignac fault to the west are natural boundaries that can be used to delimit the massif more precisely.

Chaumeil, nestled at the foot of the Sac au May (the most accessible and popular summit of the Monédières thanks to its 360° panorama of the Plateau Millevaches, the Puys des Mounts of Cantal and the Puy de Sancy) is geographically located in the centre of the massif. The Maison de Pays des Monédières is a space within the town that contains an exhibition hall and a museum.

Even if the Puy de la Monédière is the highest point, it is most often the Sac au May, at 908 metres, that appears on road and tourist maps. It offers a wide panoramic view of the distance, overlooking the steep cirque of Freysselines. The difference in altitude is very noticeable.

The Puy de Sarran rises to an altitude of 819 metres. The summit is known for its triple calvary, its recent orientation table and the panorama open to the Corrèze, the Puy Mary and the Puy de Sancy.

With a total area of approximately 67 km^{2}, the Massif des Monédières is divided between the municipalities of :

- Treignac, Affieux, Veix and Lestards to the north;
- Pradines, Grandsaigne, Bonnefond and Saint-Yrieix-le-Déjalat to the east;
- Chaumeil, Saint-Augustin and Sarran to the south;
- Madranges, Le Lonzac and Saint-Salvadour to the west.

The Monédières are separated from the Plateau Limousin, to the west, by the river courses of the Vimbelle and the Madrange, and from the Plateau de Millevaches, to the east, by the Corrèze river and the Corrèze de Pradines stream. The Cirque de Freysselines to the south, and the Cirque de Veix to the north, carved into granite rock, offer gorge-like vistas and are places where moorland is omnipresent, among which you can find heather, ferns, broom, blueberry and raspberry bushes.

The different ridge lines are marked by the Col de Lestards (856m), the Col des Géants (824m), the Col du Bos (815m), the Col du Loup (847m), the Col de la Blanche (902m) and the Sac au May (908m).

=== Main peaks ===
The whole of the Massif des Monédières is made up of 33 puys or puechs. Its rounded peaks dominate the surrounding valleys by more than 500 metres and are part of a complex called the Montagne Limousine. The highest puys of the Monédières are:

- le Puy de la Monédière, highest point 922m
- le Puy de la Jarrige, 909m
- le Suc au May, 908m,
- le Puy Messou, 907 mètres
- le Puy de Chauzeix, 893 mètres
- le Puy du Bos, 891 mètres
- le Puy Mougeau, 889 mètres
- le Puy Lafajole, 876 mètres
- le Puy Charrin, 869 mètres
- le Peuch Géant, 856 mètres
- le Puy Masmonteil, 844 mètres
- le Puy de Gussange, 838 mètres
- le Puy Galingard, 827 mètres
- le Puy de Sarran, 819 mètres
- le Puy d'Agnoux, 811 mètres
- le Puy d'Entraygues, 811 mètres
- le Puy Baladour, 789 mètres
- le Puy Pantout, 770 mètres
- le Puy de la Roche, 768 mètres
- le Puy Blanc, 755 mètres
- le Puy Tilleul, 734 mètres
- le Puy Lachaud, 717 mètres
- le Puy d'Orliac, 705 mètres.
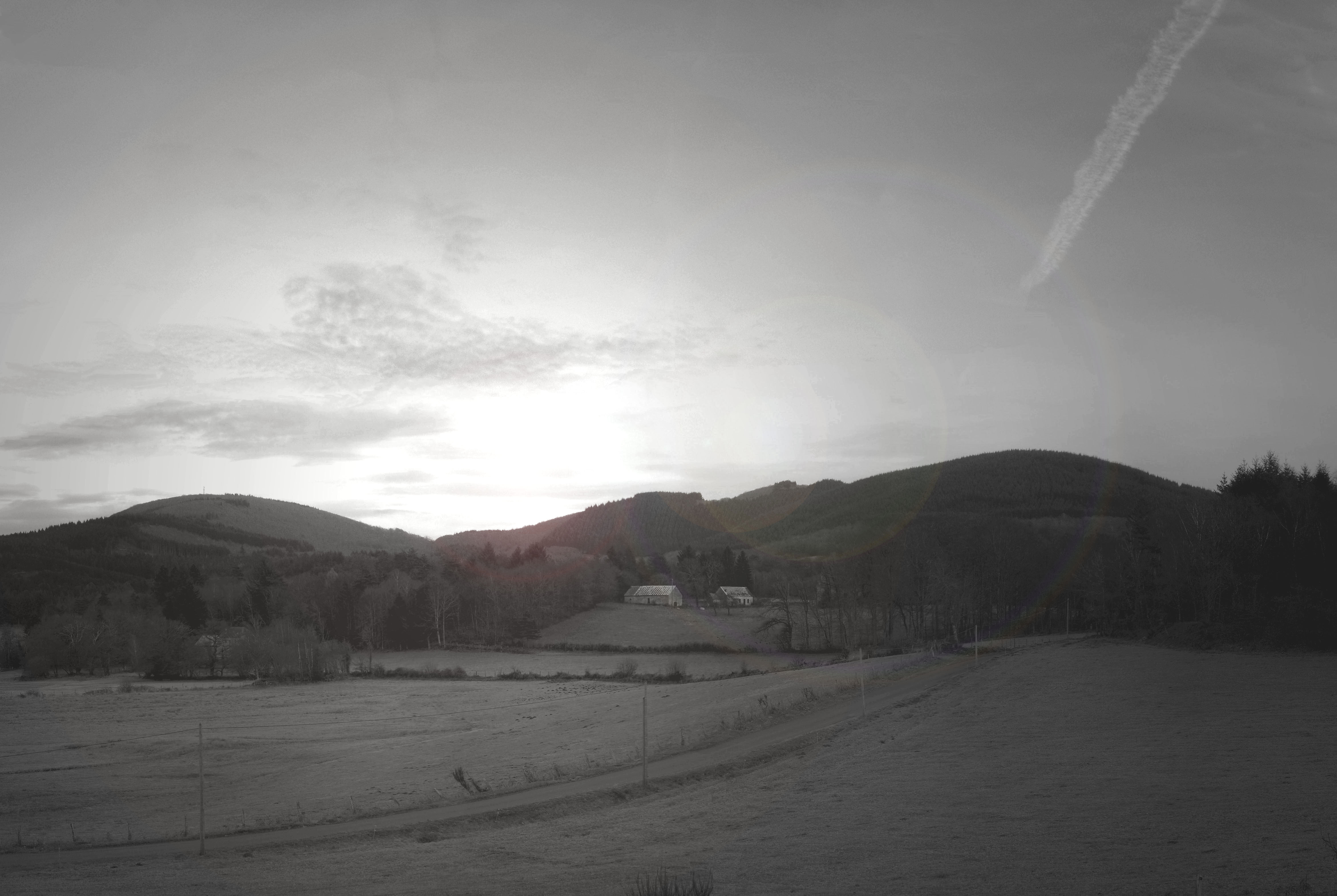
Landscape of the Monédières.

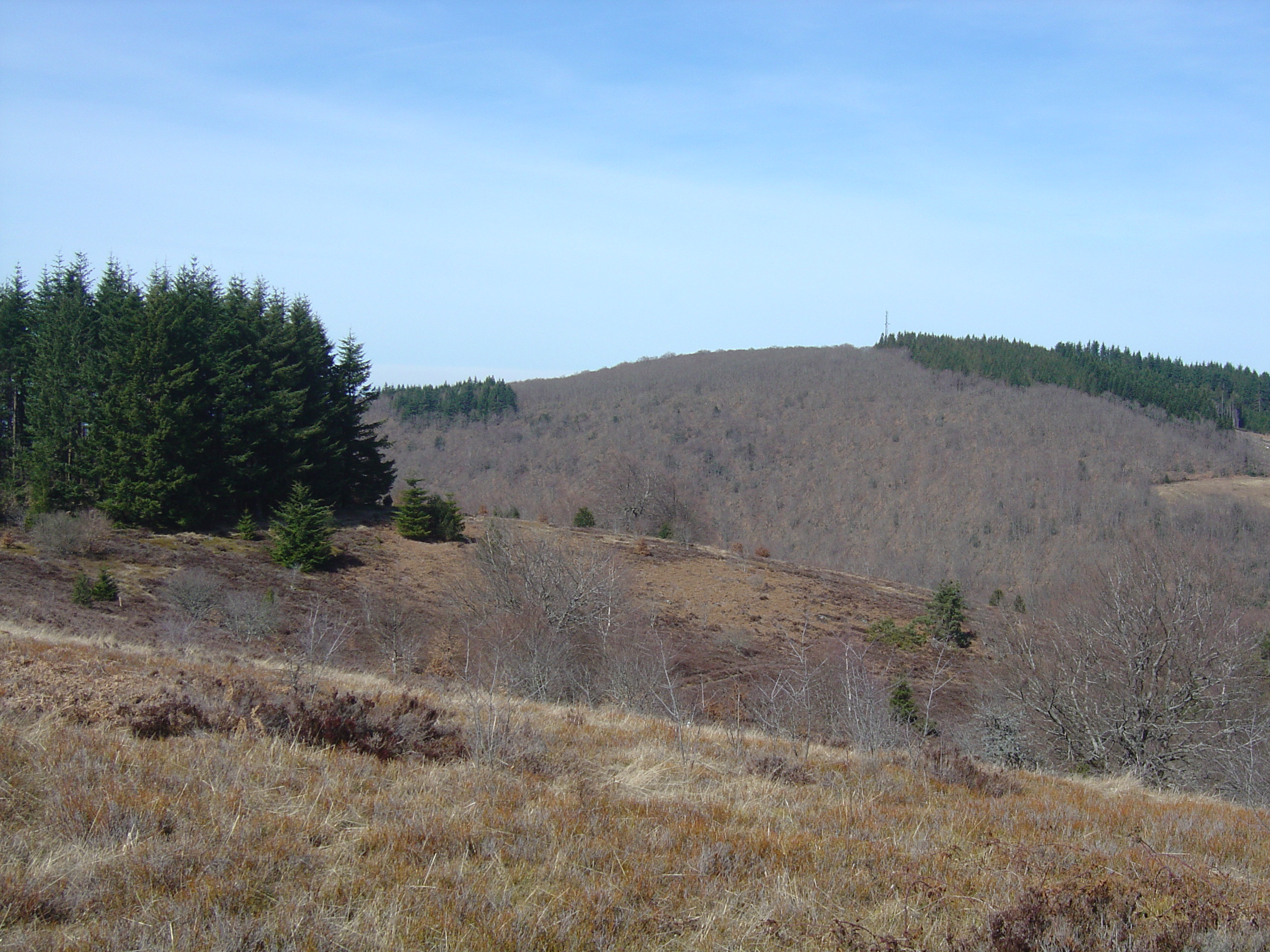
The Puy de la Monédière, the highest point of the massif.

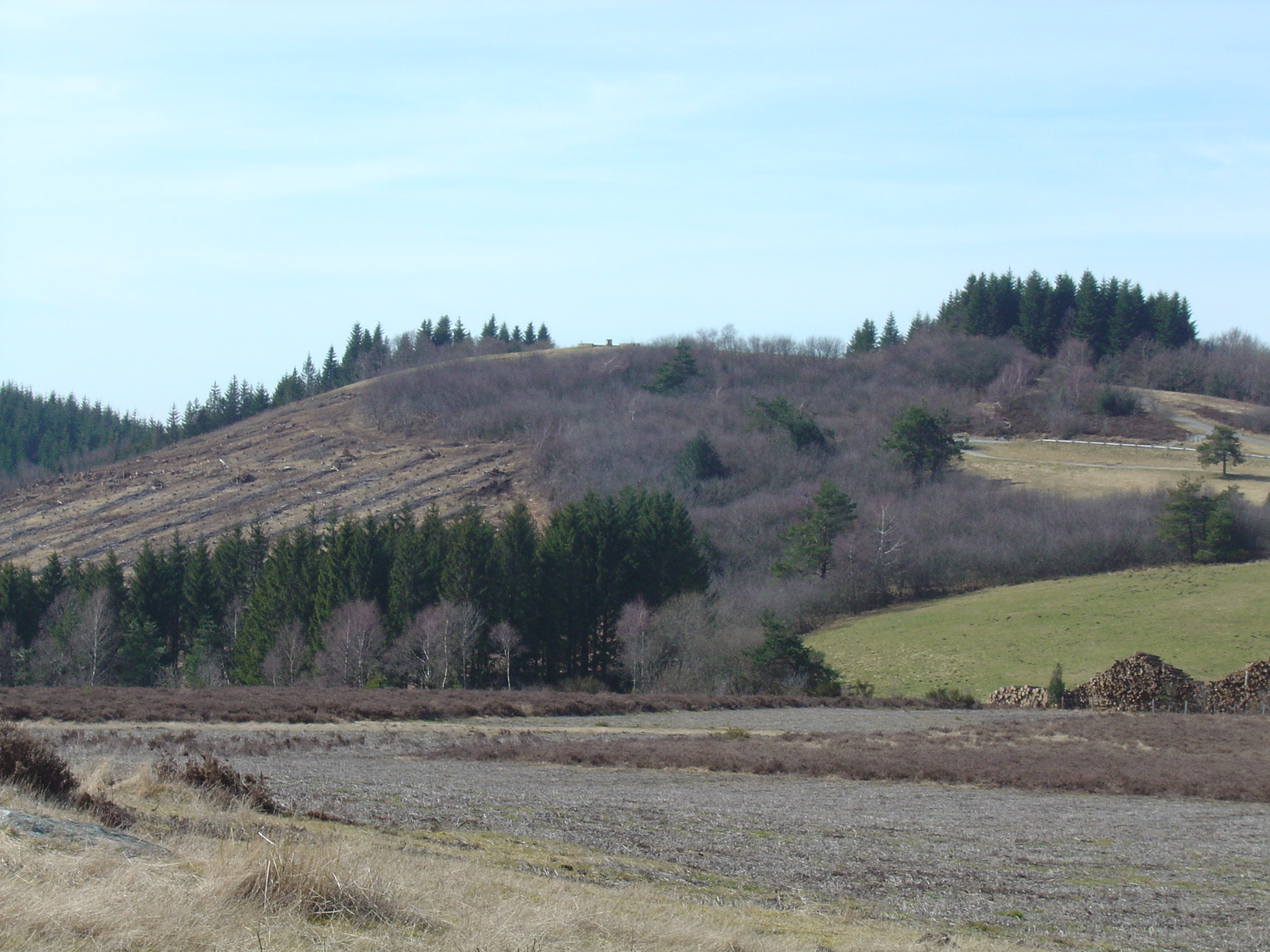
The Suc au May.

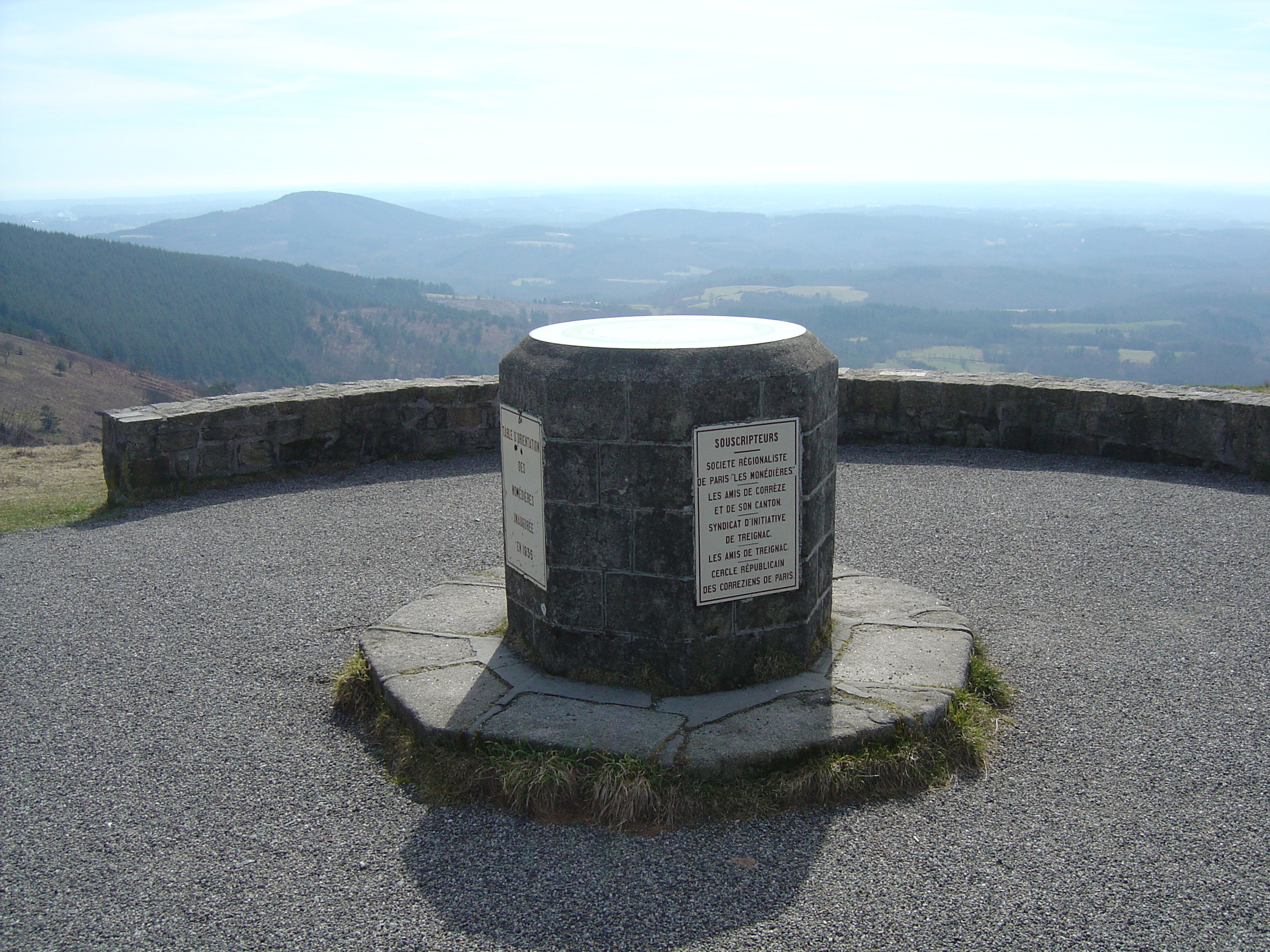
Table d'orientation at the Suc au May.

=== Flora and fauna ===
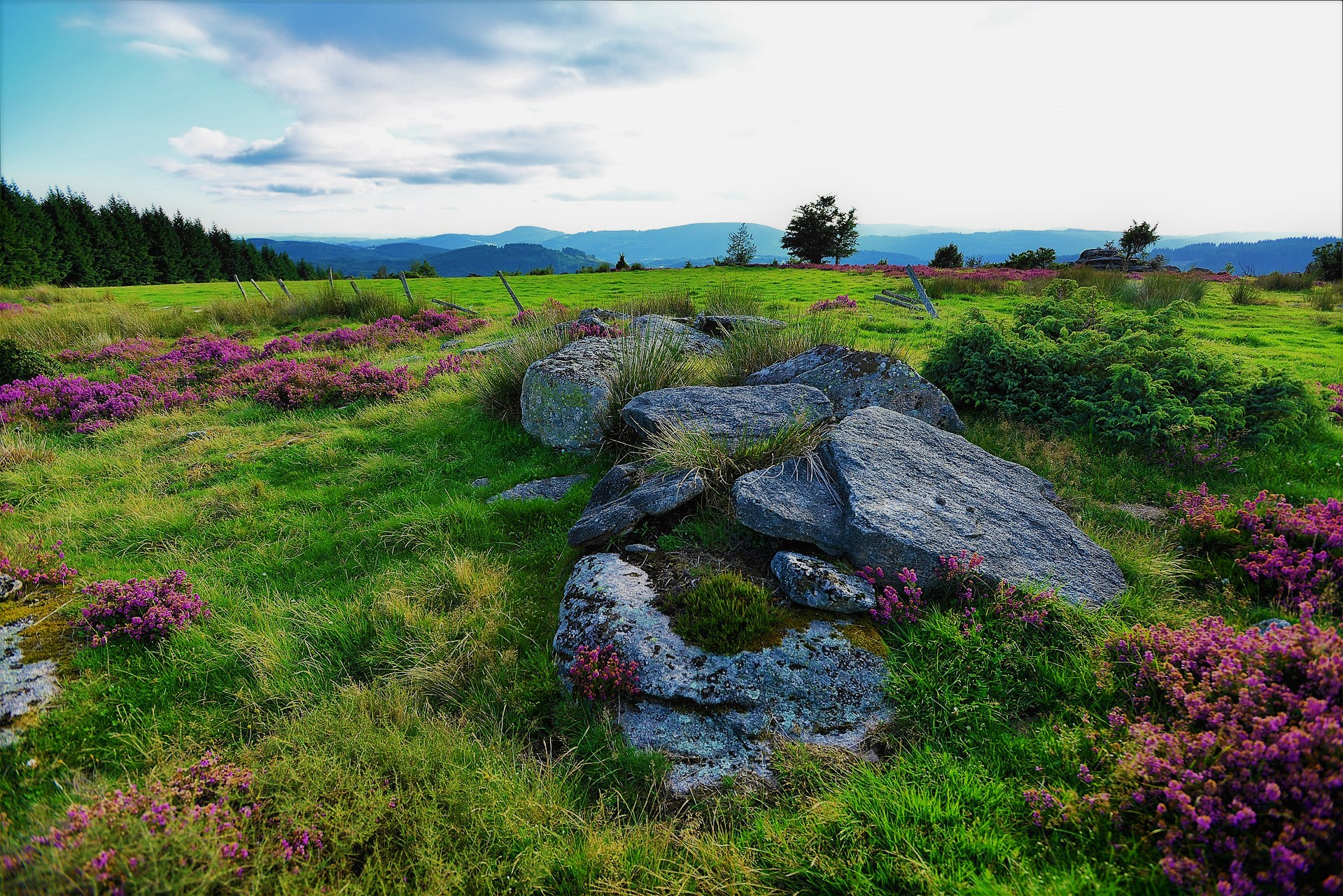
Heather panorama of the Monédières.

The moors of the Monédières are among the richest in Limousin and the Nouvelle-Aquitaine region. They are characterized by common heather (which turns purple in summer), dwarf gorse, buckthorn, bell heather, St. John's wort and wild pear. At altitude, they are tinged with mountain nuances with blueberry, arnica and gentian. Spread over the whole of the Puys, the vast coniferous forests are quite reminiscent of the landscapes of the Ballons des Vosges. Beech forests mingle everywhere with pine forests and contain trees as remarkable as they are very old. The pastoral economy is trying to revitalise the moors throughout the massif. The flora in the heart of the Col des Géants peat bog is singular and remarkable for its specificity, in particular thanks to the presence of carnivorous herbaceous plants.

The fauna is characterized by the presence in the massif of the Short-toed snake eagle, the woodlark, the European nightjar, the hen harrier, the Western green lizard, the Sand lizard, the viviparous lizard, the European otter and the barbastelle. Flocks of sheep cover the massif in order to satisfy the pastoral economy. The wolf is officially back in Haute-Corrèze, such as the chamois, now established on the Plateau Millevaches and the Massif des Monédières. The stag beetle is frequently found along a path on the summits of the Monédières.

== Activities ==
=== Cycling ===
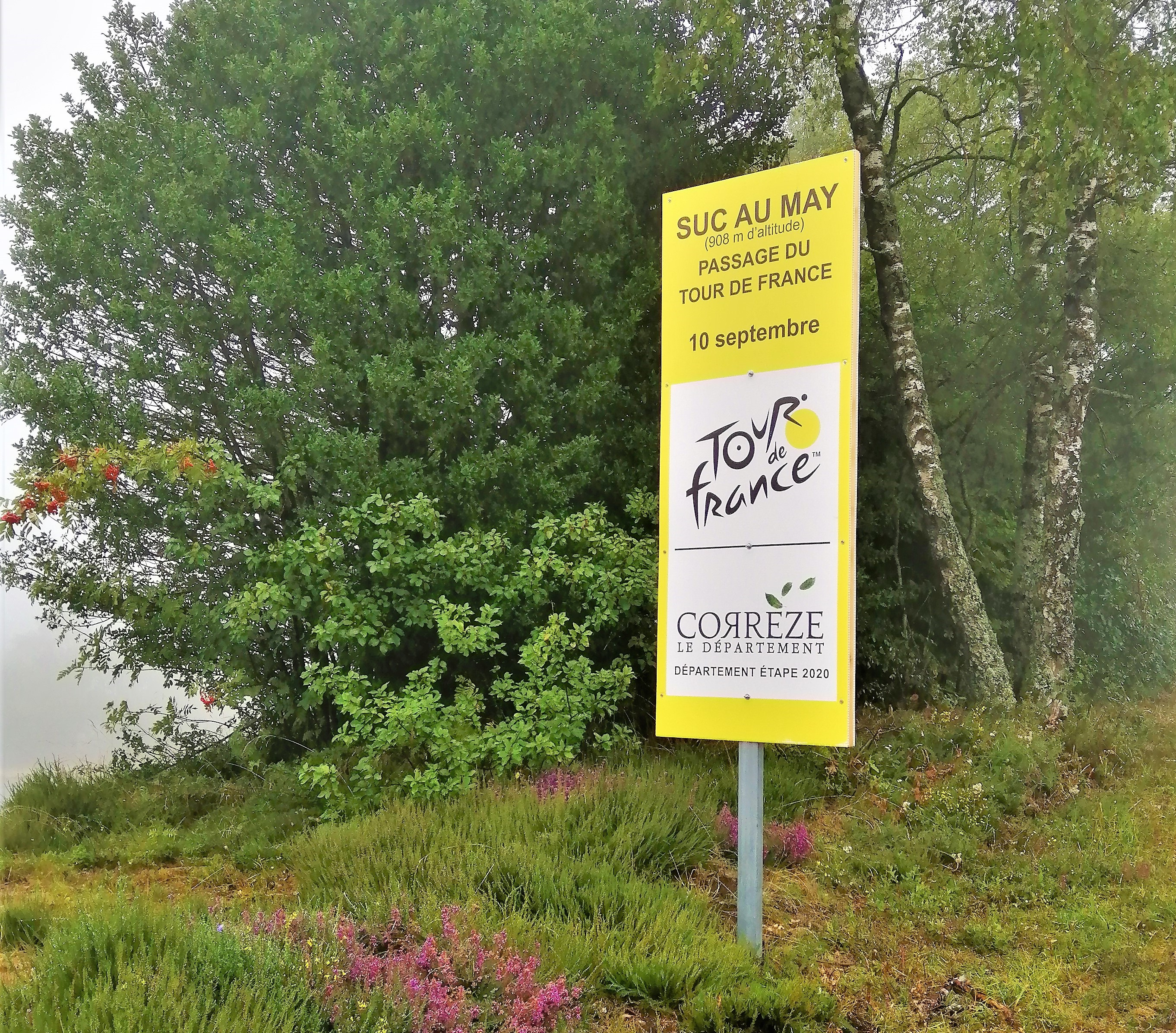
Passage du Tour de France 2020.

The Bol d'Or des Monédières cycling race, launched by the accordionist Jean Ségurel, was run in the massif and saw such prestigious winners as Jacques Anquetil, Raymond Poulidor, Bernard Hinault, Laurent Fignon, Richard Virenque, Jacky Durand, Laurent Jalabert and Cédric Vasseur.

The 7th-stage of the 1998 Tour de France saw the victory for Jan Ullrich, who at the same time took the yellow jersey during a 58-kilometer time trial between Meyrignac-l'Église and Corrèze via Chaumeil. The 12th-stage of the 2020 Tour de France passed in the direct vicinity of the Suc au May after passing the Col des Géants.

The Massif des Monédières and its many difficulties are an ideal terrain for the Tour du Limousin which has made it an almost unmissable place to pass through during the Corrèze stage.

Among the many possible climbs in the massif offered to cyclists, three are listed as difficult :

- the ascent of the Suc au May from Boulou: 9.9 km of climb with an average gradient of 3.8% (max passage to 7.5%);
- the ascent of the Suc au May from Chaumeil: 3.8 km of climb with an average gradient of 7.7% (maximum passage to 17.8%);
- the Col de Lestards from Treignac: 5.1 km of climb with an average gradient of 6% (maximum passage at 11%).

=== Other sports activities ===
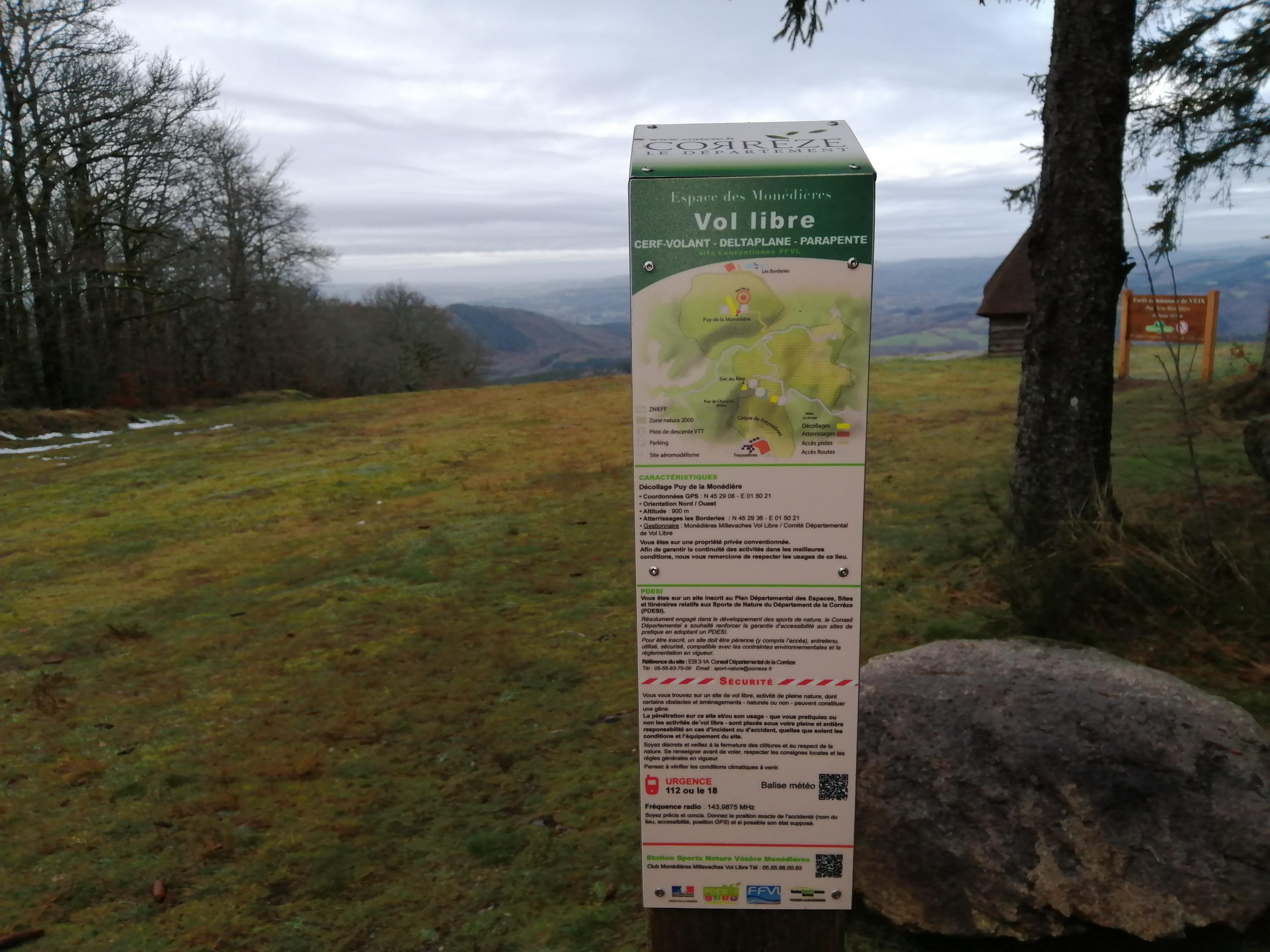
Take-off area for free flight activities, such as paragliding, located at the top of the Puy de la Monédière, and at the same time it is also the starting point for the downhill mountain bike trail.

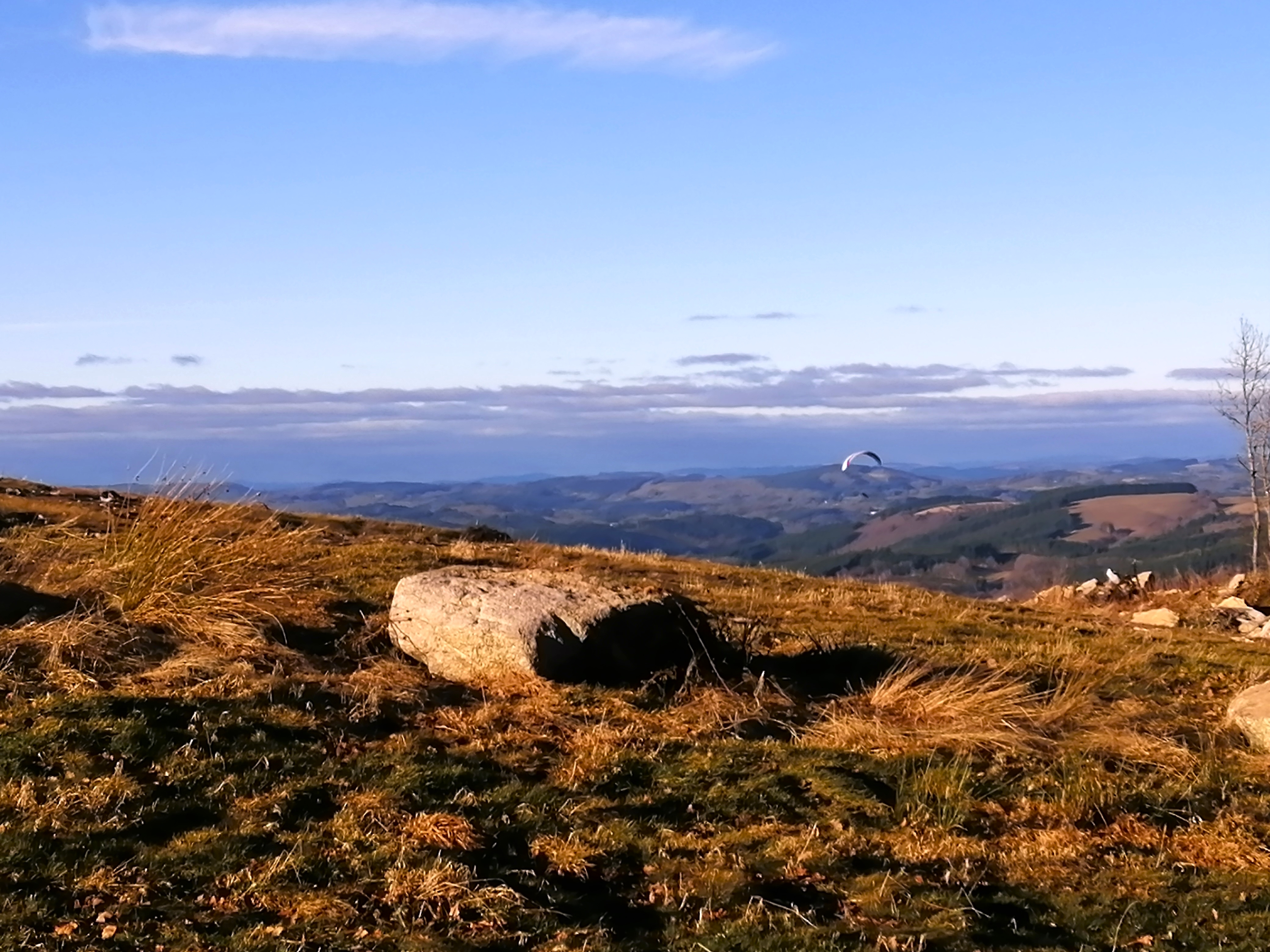
Paraglider takes off from the top of the Puy de la Monédière. There are take-off areas on the massif set up at the four cardinal points, making Monédières one of the few take-off sites in France benefiting from all orientations.

The Suc au May and the Puy de la Monédière are home to several take-off sites for paragliding, with possible baptisms, downhill mountain biking thanks to a landscaped track, not to mention a multitude of hikes or horseback rides, in particular the GR440 hiking trail, 184 kilometres long, which passes through the Suc au May, and the GR46 trail, 145 kilometres long, whose route crosses various puys of the Massif des Monédières to Rocamadour.

Canoeing on the Vézère allows descents with rapids areas. The French Canoe-Kayak Federation also organises an annual round of the French Downhill Kayak Championship in Treignac. Rounds of the Kayak Downhill World Cup were held here in 1958, 2000 and 2019. In 2022, Treignac was designated to organize the Kayak World Championships.

The many rivers that crisscross the massif on all sides allow you to practice fly fishing.

During the winter season, the snow cover makes it possible to operate the cross-country ski resort of Chadebec, located in the town of Bonnefond, perched at an altitude of more than 900 metres. The resort offers 5 cross-country ski trails ranging from 3 to 18 km long and four trails specially designed for snowshoeing enthusiasts.

=== Tourism ===
The suc au May alone welcomes about 40,000 visitors each year and the number of visitors in the whole of the Massif des Monédières is estimated at 50,000.

La Pierre des Druides is a natural curiosity culminating at an altitude of 732 metres in the territory of Affieux. A large block of flattened granite is detached from the vast rock that supports it. A shape carved into the rock is reminiscent of a human figure. It is claimed that in the time of the Celts human victims were sacrificed there.

In Lestards, the Saut de la Virole is accessible from the hamlet of Coissac; a narrow steep path plunges down to the waterfall, where the Vézère winds its way between the granite boulders.

In Lonzac, the Gour du Sault sur la Madrange is a waterfall, also called the Boissy waterfall. Has its source at an altitude of nearly 800 metres, at the Col du Bos, 6 km upstream, the Madrange river, which is very rich in fish and rich in brown trout, decreases very quickly (400 metres of negative difference in altitude over 6 kilometres), until it forms the waterfall. The Gour du Sault takes its name from the Occitan Gorg which means "water hole" and from the Old French Sault which means " fast ".

In Treignac, the Saut du Loup is an emblematic place in the Monédières that allows you to appropriate the particularities of the massif. A path runs along the Vézère and leads to one of the most beautiful panoramas of this small town and passes by the Lac des Bariousses, labelled "Blue Flag of Europe", where a leisure centre allows swimming, fishing, canoeing, paddle boarding.

In Sarran, in a set of modern architectural buildings located inside a vast landscaped park decorated with water mirrors, the museum of President Jacques Chirac presents a large collection of gifts that were offered to the "son of the country" during his two presidential terms from 1995 to 2007. A gallery is intended to host various temporary exhibitions throughout the year.

=== Environmental protection ===
The massif is home to a classified area of the Natura 2000 Network, the Landes des Monédières, representing about 40% of its surface.
