= Puy de la Monédière =

Mountain in France

- Location within France Location within Europe

Highest point
- Elevation: 922 m (3,025 ft)
- Coordinates: 45°29′05″N 1°50′23″E

Geography
- Location: Corrèze departement, France
- Parent range: Massif des Monédières, (Massif Central)

The Puy de la Monédière, sometimes called Puy de Monédière, is a summit of the Massif Central in France. At an altitude of 922 metres, it is located in the Nouvelle-Aquitaine region, in the Corrèze department, in the Massif des Monédières, of which it is the highest point. The summit is equipped with an orientation table and is frequented for its panorama, its descent for mountain biking and for the paragliding.

== Toponymy ==
The etymology of the word Monédière dates back to the Latin Monteis Diei and means "Mount of the Day". This assertion has nevertheless been questioned by Pierre Monteil.

== Geography ==
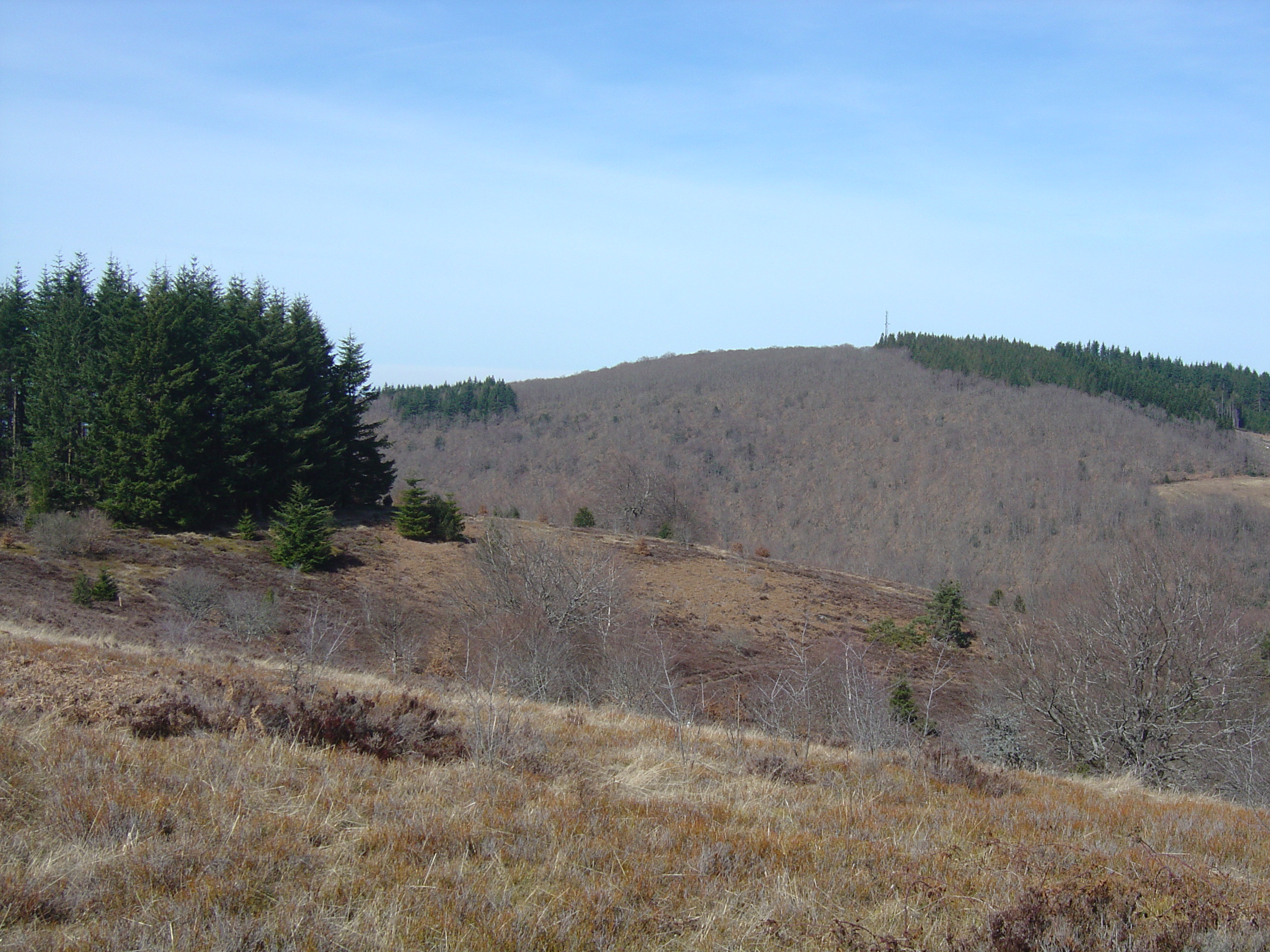
Le Puy at the beginning of March 2009.

The Puy de la Monédière is located in the commune of Veix on the Massif des Monédières and in the perimeter of the Parc naturel régional de Millevaches en Limousin.

The dominant summit of the Puy de la Monédière and the hollowed out of the Veix valley below contrast sharply with the Limousin landscapes. As the altitude increase, the landscape turns to moors with thickets of heather, wild blueberries, broom and gorse that have settled on the granite base. Above 700 metres, the flora gradually turns to mountain arnica and yellow gentian. From June through to September, the slopes of heather turn purple.

There is an orientation table at the top of the Puy de la Monédière, but unlike those present at the Suc au May and the Puy de Sarran, offering 360-degree panoramas, at the Puy de la Monédière, due to a dense coniferous forest that obstructs part of the horizon, the panorama covers a 180-degree view.
