= Saint-Augustin, Corrèze =

Saint-Augustin
- Commune
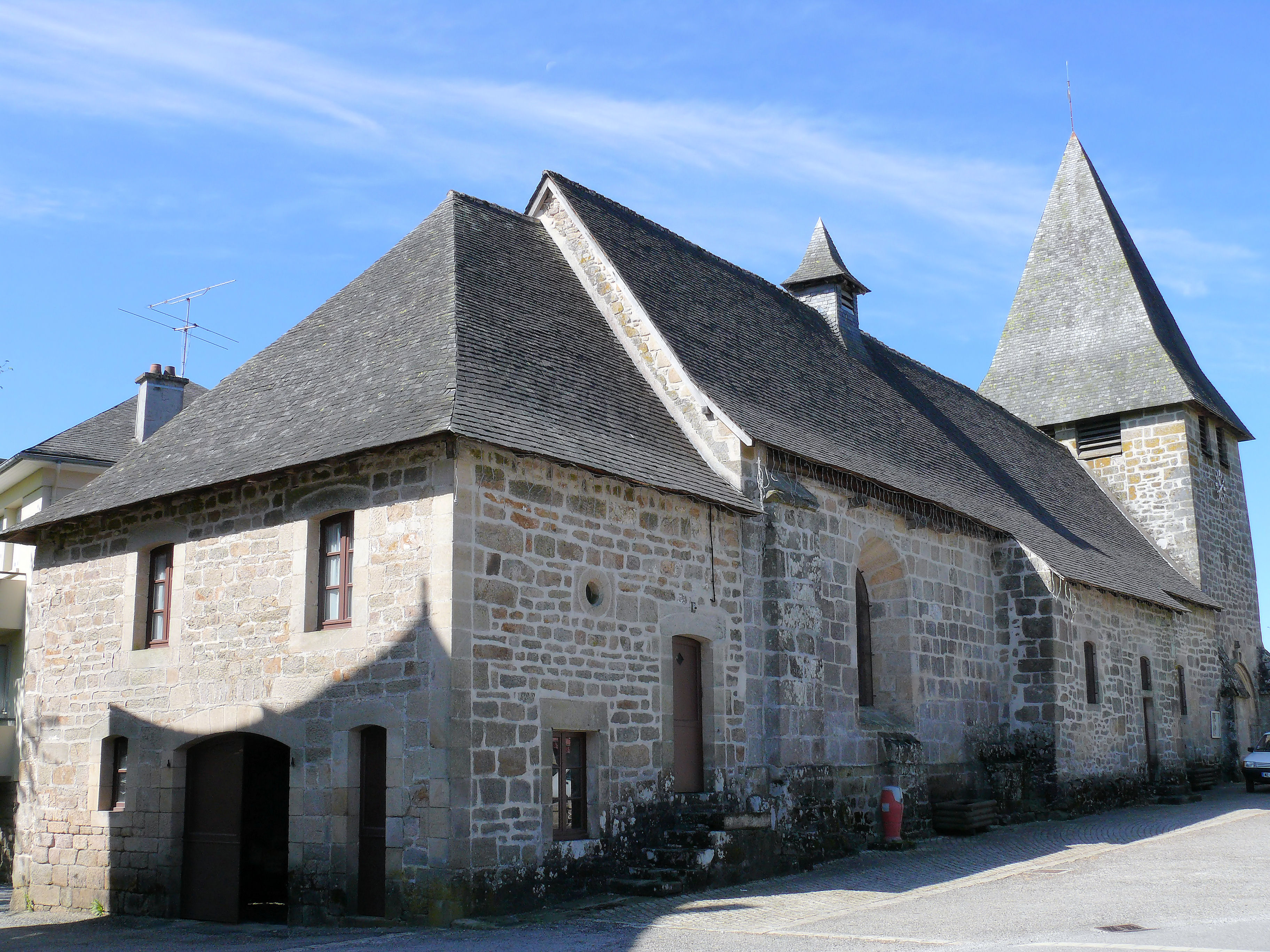
- The church in Saint-Augustin

- Coat of arms
- Location of Saint-Augustin
- Location within France Location within Nouvelle-Aquitaine
- Coordinates: 45°25′30″N 1°50′19″E
- Country: France
- Region: Nouvelle-Aquitaine
- Department: Corrèze
- Arrondissement: Tulle
- Canton: Naves
- Intercommunality: CA Tulle Agglo

Government
  - Mayor (2026–32): Marcel Auboiroux
- Area^{1}: 29.31 km^{2} (11.32 sq mi)
- Elevation: 350 m (1,150 ft)
- Highest elevation: 897 m (2,943 ft)
- Lowest elevation: 355 m (1,165 ft)
- Population (2023): 427
  - Density: 14.6/km^{2} (37.7/sq mi)
- Time zone: UTC+01:00 (CET)
  - Summer (DST): UTC+02:00 (CEST)
- INSEE/Postal code: 19181 /19390
- ^{1} French Land Register data, which excludes lakes, ponds, glaciers > 1 km^{2} (0.386 sq mi or 247 acres) and river estuaries.

Saint-Augustin (French pronunciation: [sɛ̃.t‿oɡystɛ̃]; Limousin: Sent Augustin) is a commune in the Corrèze department in central France.

== Geography ==
Saint-Augustin is a commune in the Massif Central located in the Massif des Monédières.

=== Neighbouring municipalities ===
The neighbouring communes are Beaumont, Chaumeil, Madranges, Meyrignac-l'Église, Orliac-de-Bar and Veix.

=== Hydrography ===
The Madrange, a small tributary of the Vézère, has its source on the edge of the communes of Saint-Augustin and Veix. The commune is watered by the Douyge as well as by the Étang stream and then the Pont Peyri stream, (successive names of the mother branch of the Vimbelle).

== Population ==
Historical population
Year	Pop.	±% p.a.
1968	636	—
1975	536	−2.41%
1982	527	−0.24%
1990	448	−2.01%
1999	405	−1.11%
2007	438	+0.98%
2012	450	+0.54%
2017	423	−1.23%
2023	427	+0.16%
Source: INSEE

== Places and monuments ==
- Église Saint-Augustin, built in the 13th-century and modified from the 14th and 15th-centuries, listed on the Supplementary Inventory of Historic Monuments on 25 September 1929.
- The Château du Tourondel in Saint-Augustin, linked to the Viscounts of Ventadour, it was rebuilt in 1599 after a fire and now consists of rectangular building with two square towers on either side and a round tower to the rear.
- L'étang de Ganezande, a lake.
- The Col du Bos (809 m) in the northern tip of the municipal territory and north of the Suc au May.
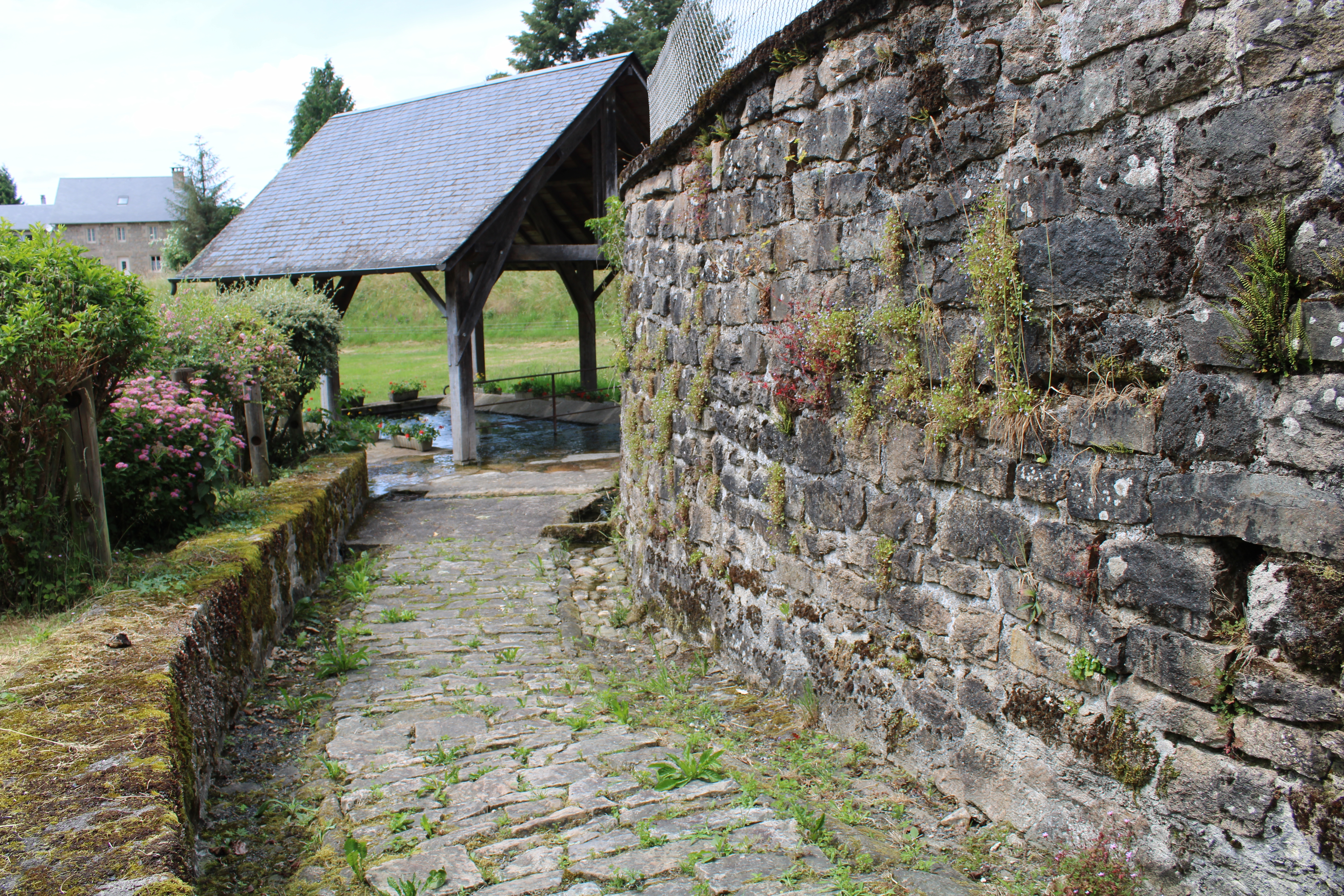
The washhouse.

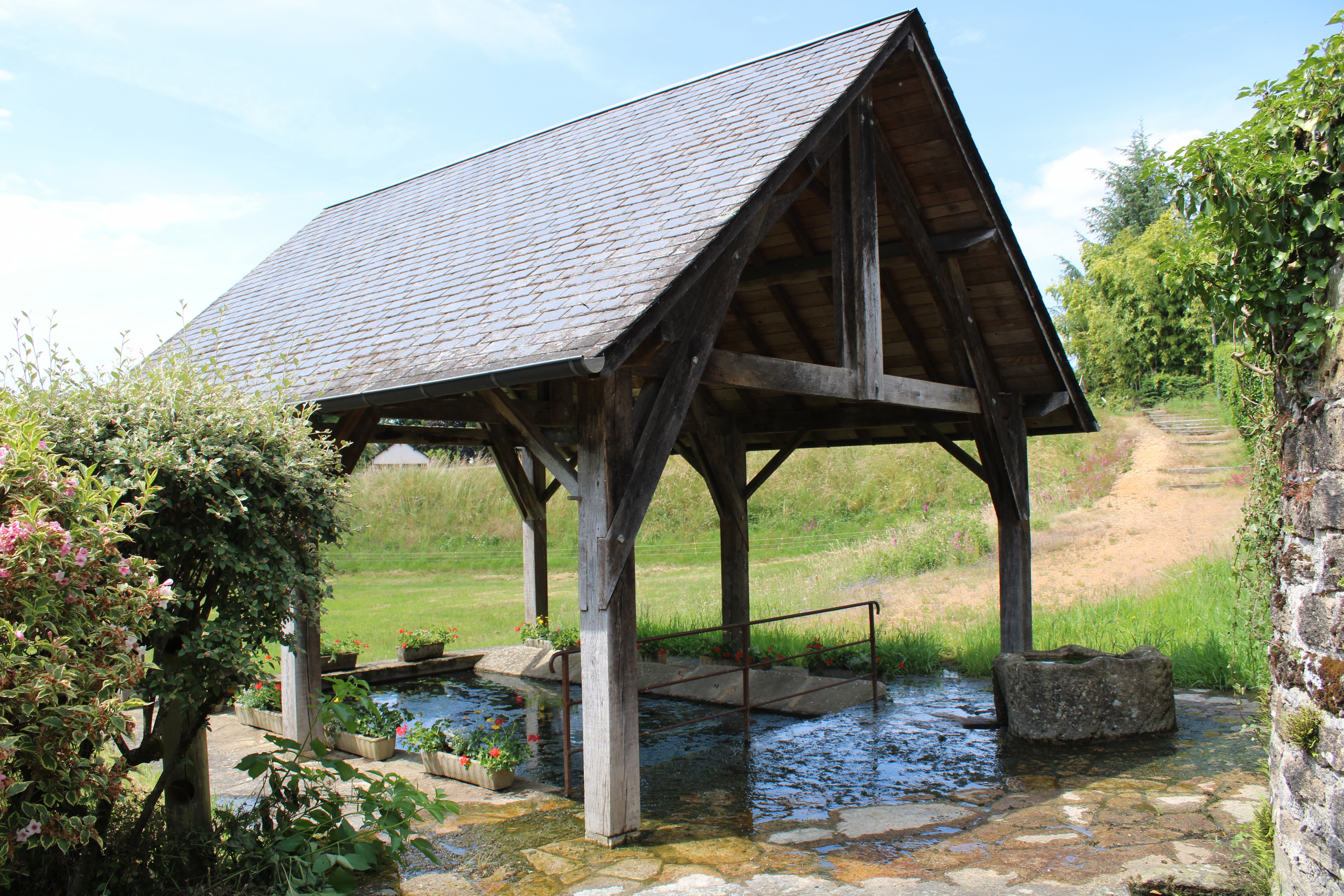
The washhouse.

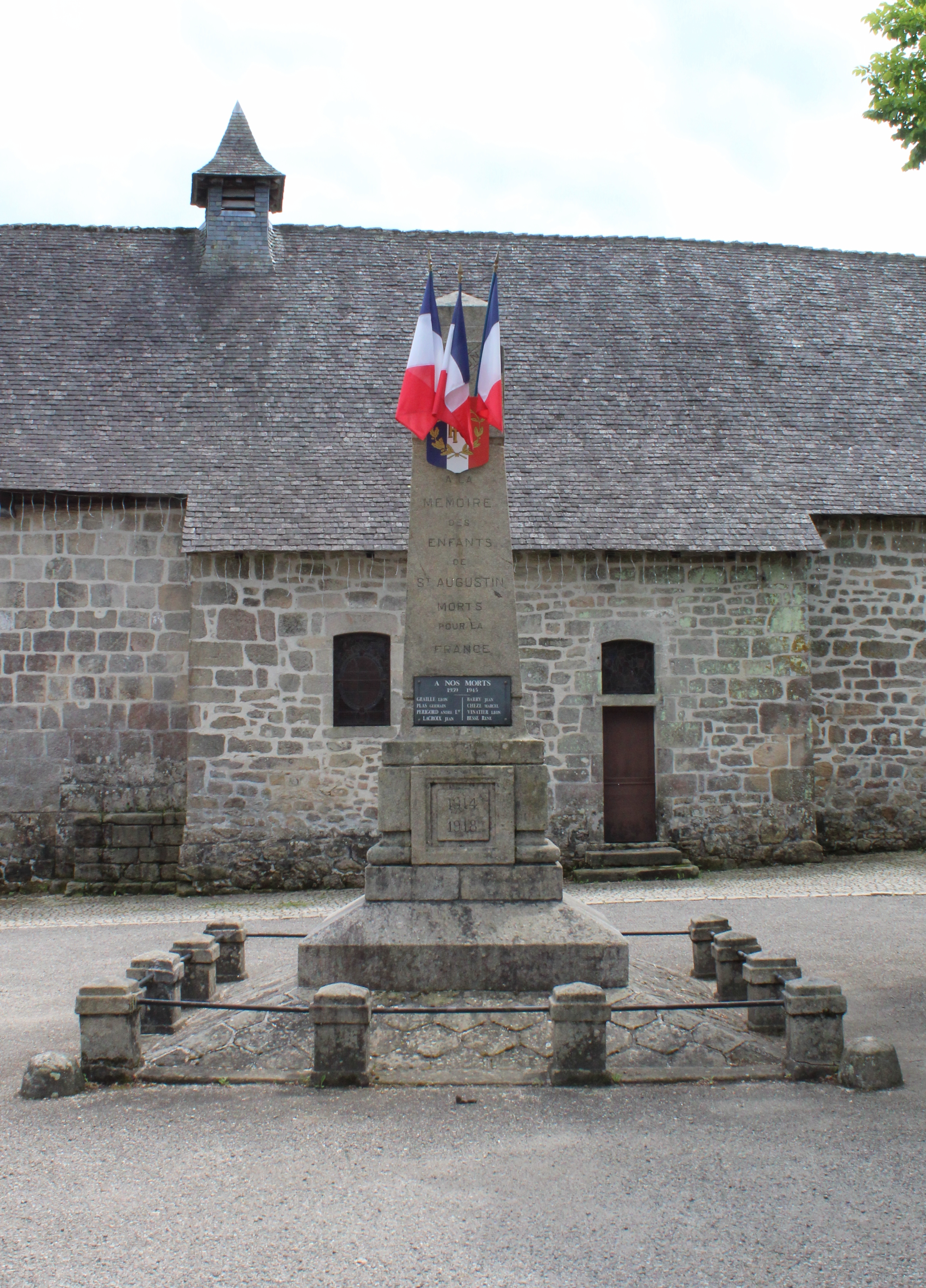
War memorial.

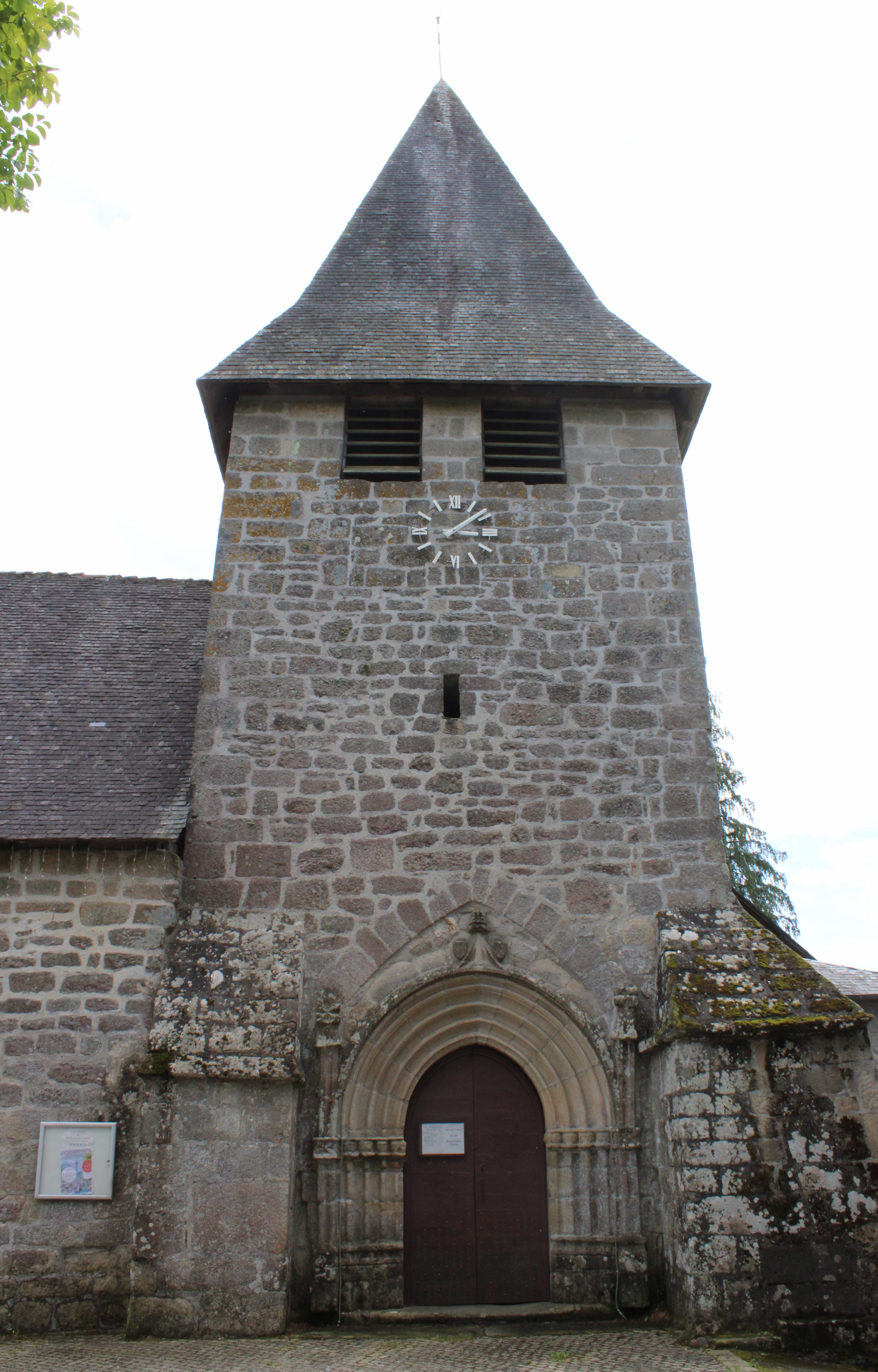
Church tower.

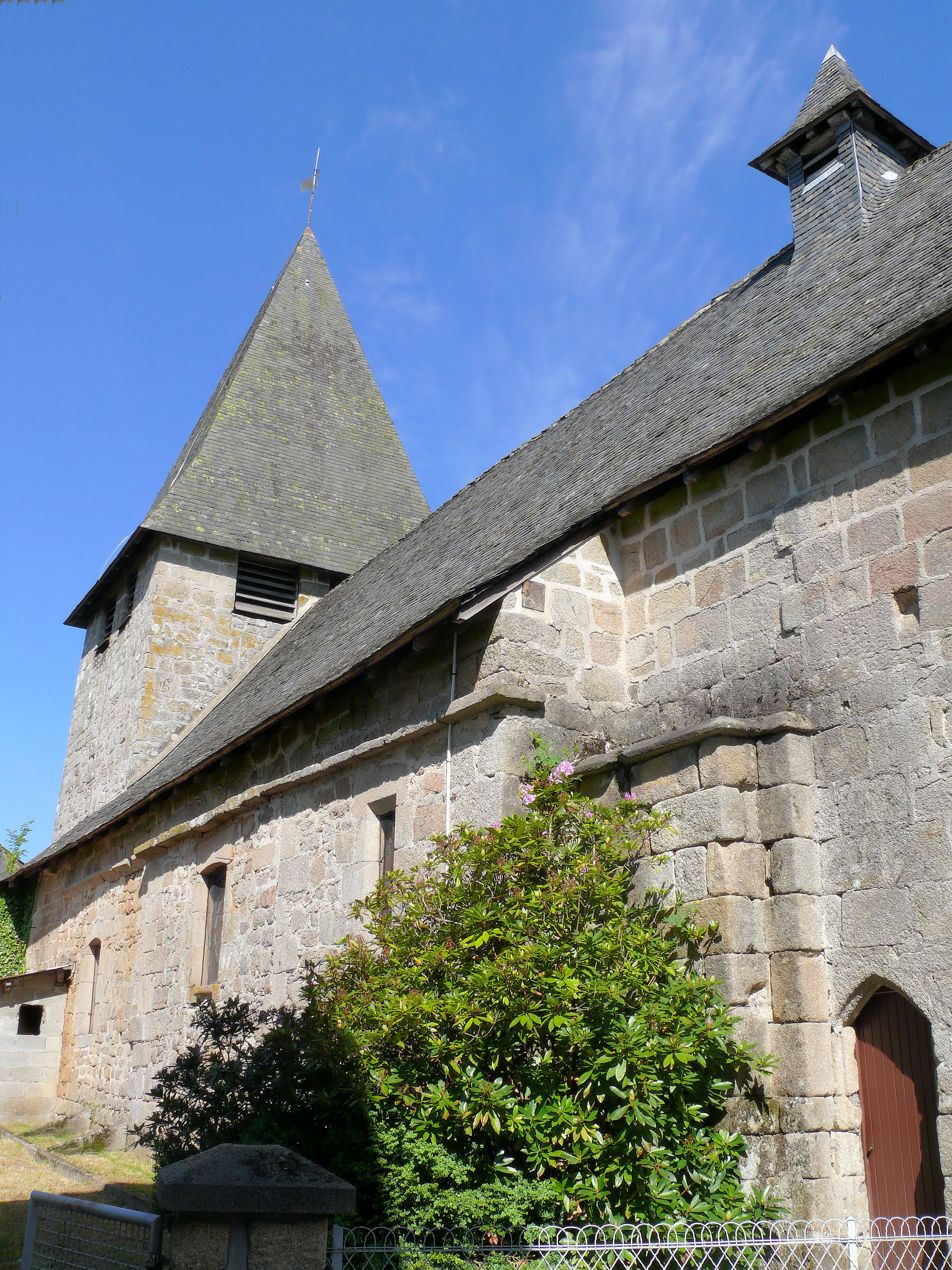
Eglise Saint-Augustin

== Personalities linked to the commune ==
- Pierre Monteil, French writer and academic, born in Saint-Augustin in 1925.
- Jean Coudert (1905-1985), former deputy mayor (1971-1983), former president of the Association of Natives of the Arrondissement of Ussel and the Corrèze Community of Paris. Former magistrate, 1st President of the Court of Appeal of Bourges and advisor to the Court of Cassation. Officer of the Legion of Honour, Croix de Guerre, Commander of the Maritine Merit, Officer of the Agricultural Merit. A street in Sornac bears his name.
- Élie Buge, born in Mézinges in the commune of Saint-Augustin (1923-1967). First non-commissioned officer pilot of the Air Force to have broken the sound barrier. Test pilot for the aircraft manufacturer Marcel Dassault.

== See also ==
- Communes of the Corrèze department
