= Puy de Sarran =

Mountain in France

- Location within France Location within Europe

Highest point
- Elevation: 819 m (2,687 ft)
- Coordinates: 45°25′08″N 1°56′43″E

Geography
- Location: Corrèze departement, France
- Parent range: Massif des Monédières, (Massif Central)

The Puy de Sarran is a summit of the Massif Central in France. At an altitude of 819m, it is located in the Nouvelle-Aquitaine region, in the Corrèze department, in the Massif des Monédières.

== Geography ==
To the north of the commune of Sarran and to the south of the l'étang de Stizaleix, in the Massif des Monédières, the summit is equipped with an orientation table and a triple calvary cross. From its summit, the mountain tops of Puy de Sancy and Puy Mary can be seen. The three wooden crosses were erected in 1883 by Father Beaujean a parish priest in Sarran. They were replaced in 1939 with cement crosses.

From the D135 road between Sarran and Saint-Yrieix-le-Déjalat, it is accessed by a municipal road.
