= Suc au May =

Mountain in France

Sac au May
- Location within France Location within Europe

Highest point
- Elevation: 908 m (2,979 ft)
- Coordinates: 45°28′17″N 1°50′32″E

Geography
- Location: Corrèze departement, France
- Parent range: Massif des Monédières, (Massif Central)

The Suc au May is a summit of the Massif Central in France, classified as a Natura 2000 area. At an altitude of 908 metres, it is located in the Nouvelle-Aquitaine region, in the Corrèze department, in the Massif des Monédières.

== Toponymy ==
Suc means "summit " in Occitan.

== History ==
In order to develop tourist activity in the cantons of Corrèze and Treignac, the authorities took advantage of the panorama of the Monédières, and an orientation table was inaugurated on 25 August 1935 by Henry de Jouvenel and attended by 4,000 people. It is the oldest orientation table in the department and in Limousin. In 1942, the Brive flying club set glider flight records at the site and in the 1950s, an airfield existed to tow gliders.

== Geography ==
=== Location ===
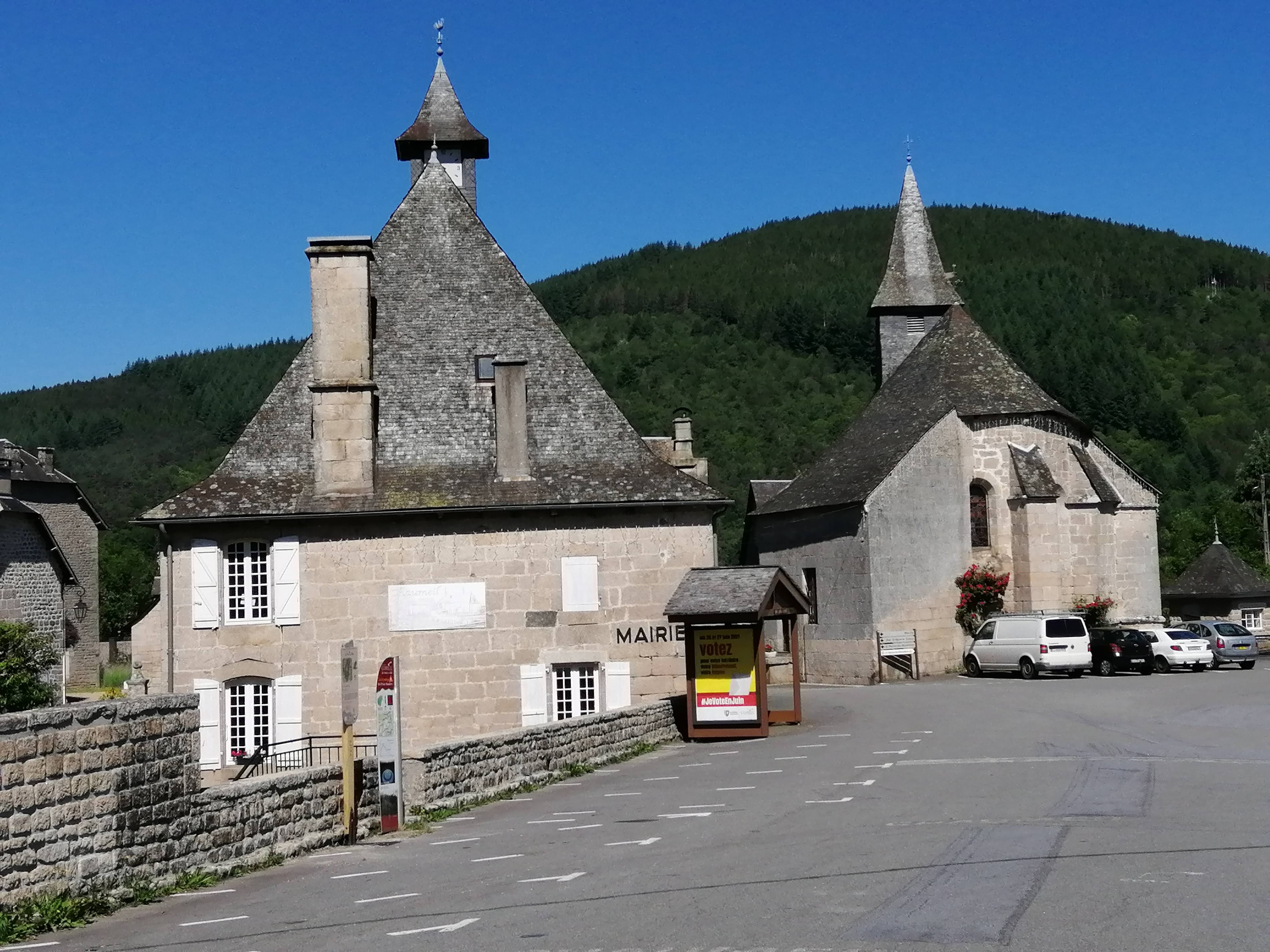
View of the eastern slope of the Suc au May from the town hall square in Chaumeil.

Within the perimeter of the Parc naturel régional de Millevaches en Limousin and in the heart of the Massif des Monédières, culminating at an altitude of 908 metres, the Suc au May is accessible from the communes of Madranges (via the Col du Bos), Treignac (via the Col des Géants) or Chaumeil, on whose commune it is located.

The D128E road approaches the summit below.

Its southern slope constitutes the Cirque of Freysselines, reinforced to the south-west by the Puy de Chauzeix (897m) and to the south-east by the Puy de la Jarrige (909m), a natural cirque with a difference in altitude of about 300m.

If the Puy de la Monédière, which gave the name to the entire massif, is the highest point with 922 metres above sea level and the Puy de la Jarrige, with 909 metres, the second highest peak of the massif, it is nevertheless that the Suc au May appears on road and tourist maps. It offers a panorama that is wide open to the distance, overlooking the steep area above the cirque of Freysselines, with views of the Plateau de Millevaches, the Mounts of Cantal, the Monts Dore, and the Puy de Sancy.

In addition, it has an orientation table dating from 1935, and is crossed by the GR440 long-distance hiking trail of 184km, and the GR46 long-distance hiking trail of 946km, whose arrival point is Rocamadour.

From the summit of the Suc au May, the difference in altitude is very noticeable.

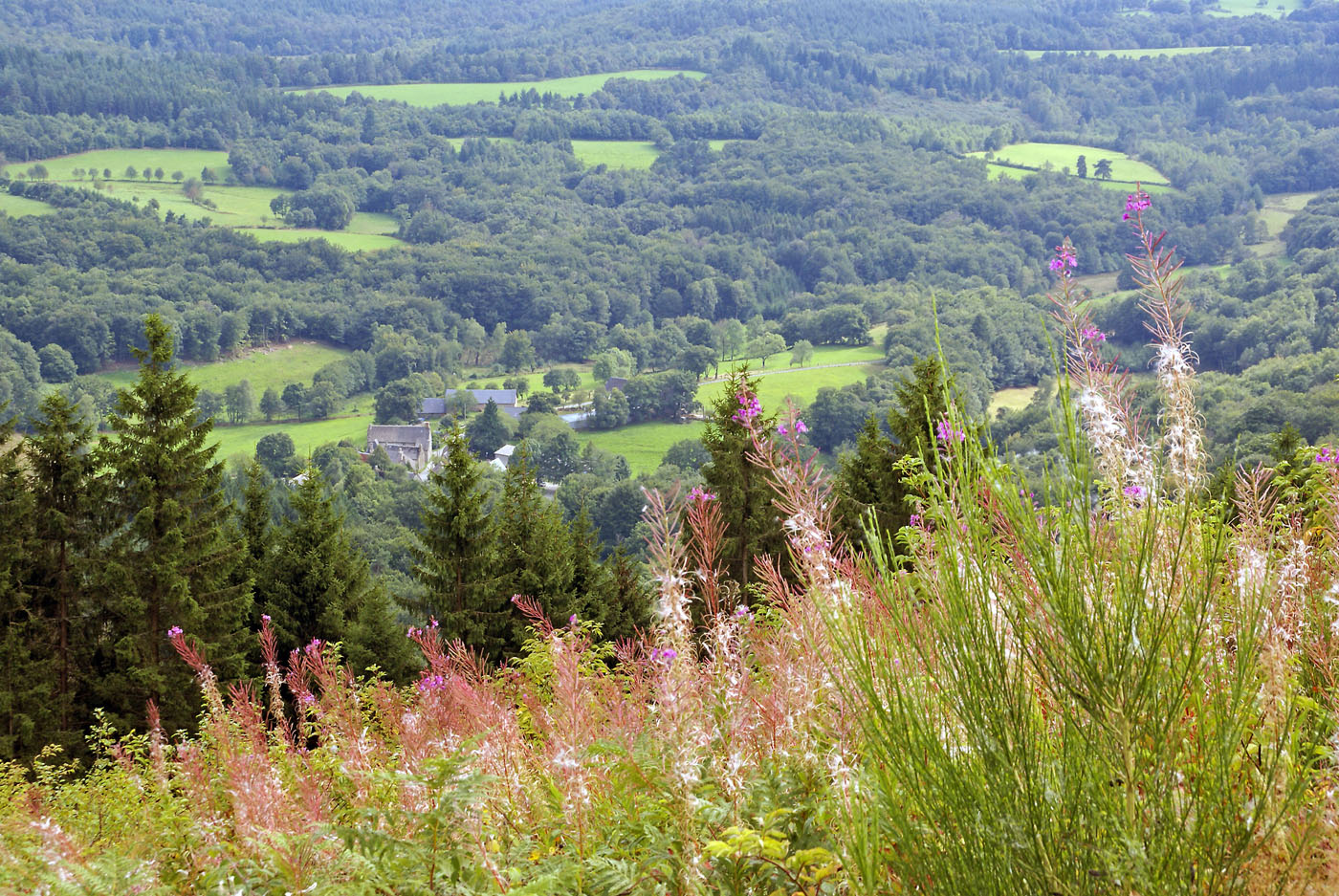
View of the village of Freysselines from the summit.

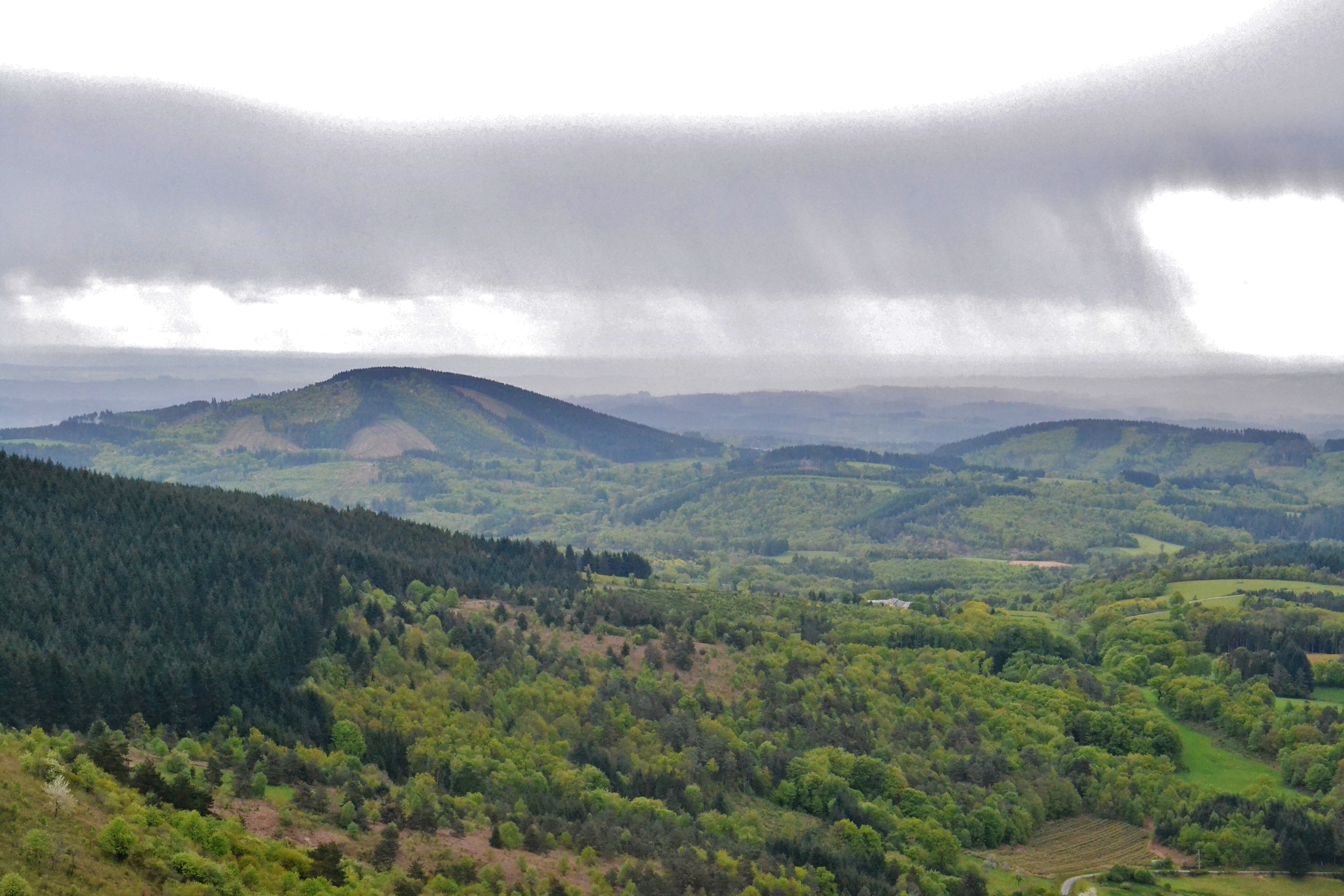
The south of Monédières towards Chaumeil from the summit.

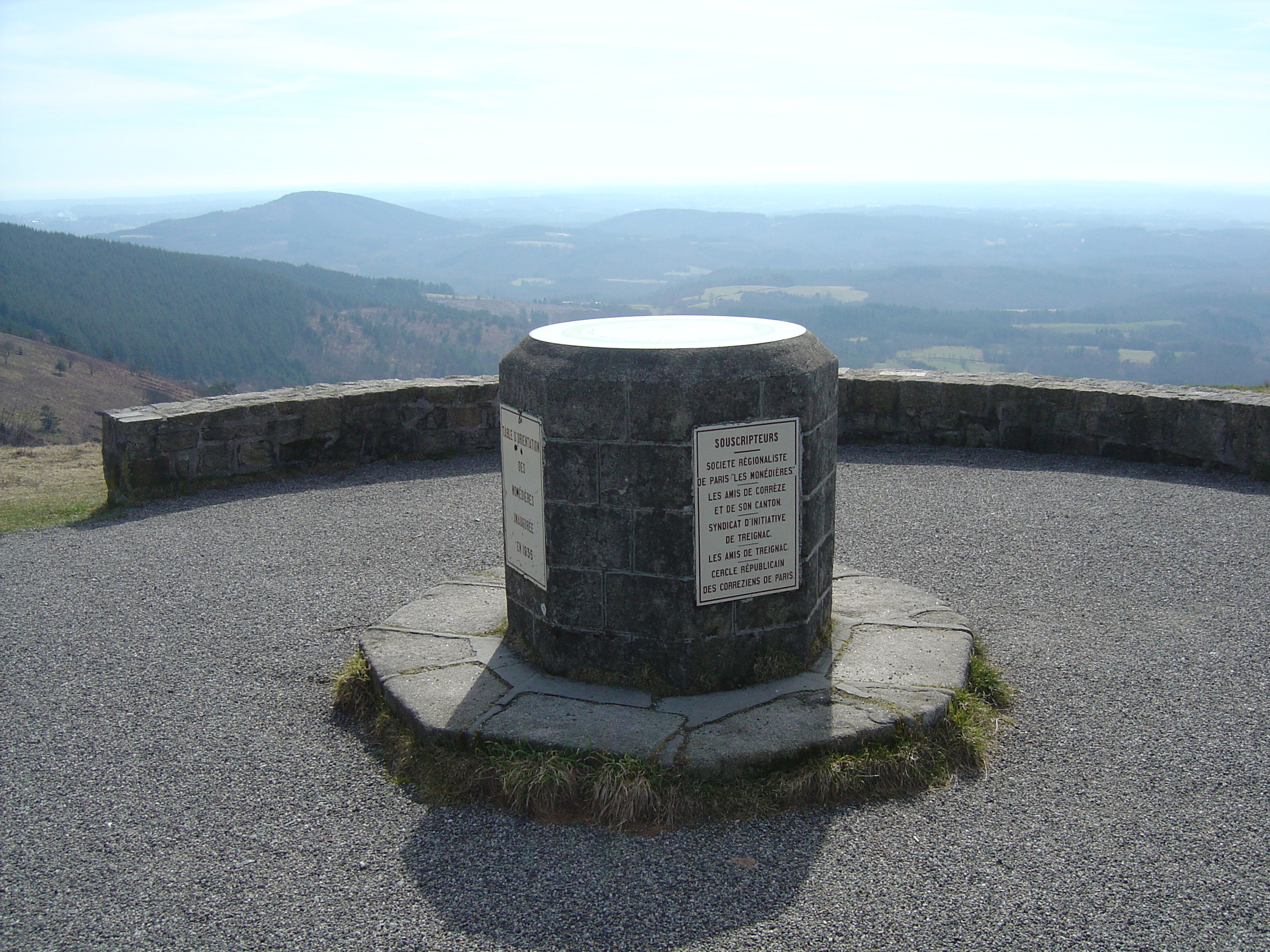
The orientation table.

=== Climate ===
A marked spring peak at the end of April, beginning of May, precedes the relative dryness of the summer months. The main oceanic degradation is due to variations in altitude, which locally give mountain tones to the climate from 700 metres. Above 800 metres, snow cover is frequent and there are few years in which one does not see one or more snowy falls on the massif.

== Activities ==
=== Cycling ===
The ascent of the Suc au May, for the first time, was on the programme of the 12th stage of the 2020 Tour de France, between Chauvigny in the Vienne and Sarran in Corrèze.

=== Paragliding ===
It is a take-off site for paragliding.

=== Hiking ===
The summit has an orientation table and is frequented because of its panorama. The site and the surrounding area are crossed in by the long-distance hiking trail 440, which passes 300 m from the summit to the east. Horseback riding is also organised.
