= Saint-Augustin =

Saint-Augustin may refer to:

== Algeria ==
- Saint Augustin Basilica, Annaba

== Canada ==
=== New Brunswick ===
- Village-Saint Augustin, New Brunswick, a community

=== Quebec ===
- Saint-Augustin, Quebec (parish), a parish municipality
- Saint-Augustin, Quebec (municipality), a municipality and settlement
- Saint-Augustin Airport
- Saint-Augustin River
- Saint-Augustin-de-Desmaures, a city west of Quebec City
- Saint-Augustin-de-Woburn, a parish municipality in the Estrie region
- Saint-Augustin, a former municipality now part of the city of Mirabel, Quebec

== France ==
- Saint-Augustin, Paris, a Catholic church
- Saint-Augustin station, a Paris Metro station on Line 9
- Saint-Augustin, Charente-Maritime, a commune
- Saint-Augustin, Corrèze, a commune
- Saint-Augustin, Pas-de-Calais, a commune
- Saint-Augustin, Seine-et-Marne, a commune
- Saint-Augustin-des-Bois, a commune in Maine-et-Loire

== Madagascar ==
- Saint Augustin, Madagascar, a town and commune
  - Bay of Saint-Augustin, the town's eponymous bay

== See also ==
- Saint Augustine (disambiguation)
