= Bonnefond =

- Commune
- Coat of arms
- Location of Bonnefond
- Location within France Location within Nouvelle-Aquitaine
- Coordinates: 45°31′52″N 1°59′02″E
- Country: France
- Region: Nouvelle-Aquitaine
- Department: Corrèze
- Arrondissement: Tulle
- Canton: Plateau de Millevaches

Government
  - Mayor (2026–32): Sylvain Bernard
- Area^{1}: 45.06 km^{2} (17.40 sq mi)
- Highest elevation: 924 m (3,031 ft)
- Lowest elevation: 657 m (2,156 ft)
- Population (2023): 115
  - Density: 2.55/km^{2} (6.61/sq mi)
- Time zone: UTC+01:00 (CET)
  - Summer (DST): UTC+02:00 (CEST)
- INSEE/Postal code: 19027 /19170
- ^{1} French Land Register data, which excludes lakes, ponds, glaciers > 1 km^{2} (0.386 sq mi or 247 acres) and river estuaries.

Bonnefond (French pronunciation: [bɔnfɔ̃]; Occitan: Bonafont) is a commune of the Corrèze department in the Nouvelle-Aquitaine in southwestern France.

== Geography ==
Commune is located on the Plateau de Millevaches in the Parc Naturel Régional de Millevaches en Limousin on the Massif Central.

At the top of the town is Chadebec, a location for cross-country skiing in the department. The communes' rivers to the north-west are the Corrèze and the Orluc stream, to the south-east by the Dadalouze and by the Corrèze de Pradines which has its source there.

== Population ==
Historical population
Year	Pop.	±% p.a.
1968	214	—
1975	163	−3.81%
1982	149	−1.27%
1990	136	−1.13%
1999	127	−0.76%
2007	131	+0.39%
2012	109	−3.61%
2017	113	+0.72%
2023	115	+0.29%
Source: INSEE

== Places and monuments ==
=== Bonnefond ===
- Église Saint-Médard de Bonnefond - a church dating from 15th-century, it was renovated in the 18th-century while the bell tower was renovated in the late 19th-century. The church houses a 15th-century pieta classified as a historical monument in 1970. Two other restored polychrome wooden statues represent Saint Roch and Saint Médard, patrons of the parish. It is listed in the General Inventory of Cultural Heritage.
- Church of Notre-Dame de Bonnefond - church mentioned in 1202 by the abbey at Saint Angel. It is listed in the General Inventory of Cultural Heritage.
- near the church, there is a medieval cross from the 16th-century, the menhir of the village and the Sully lime tree.
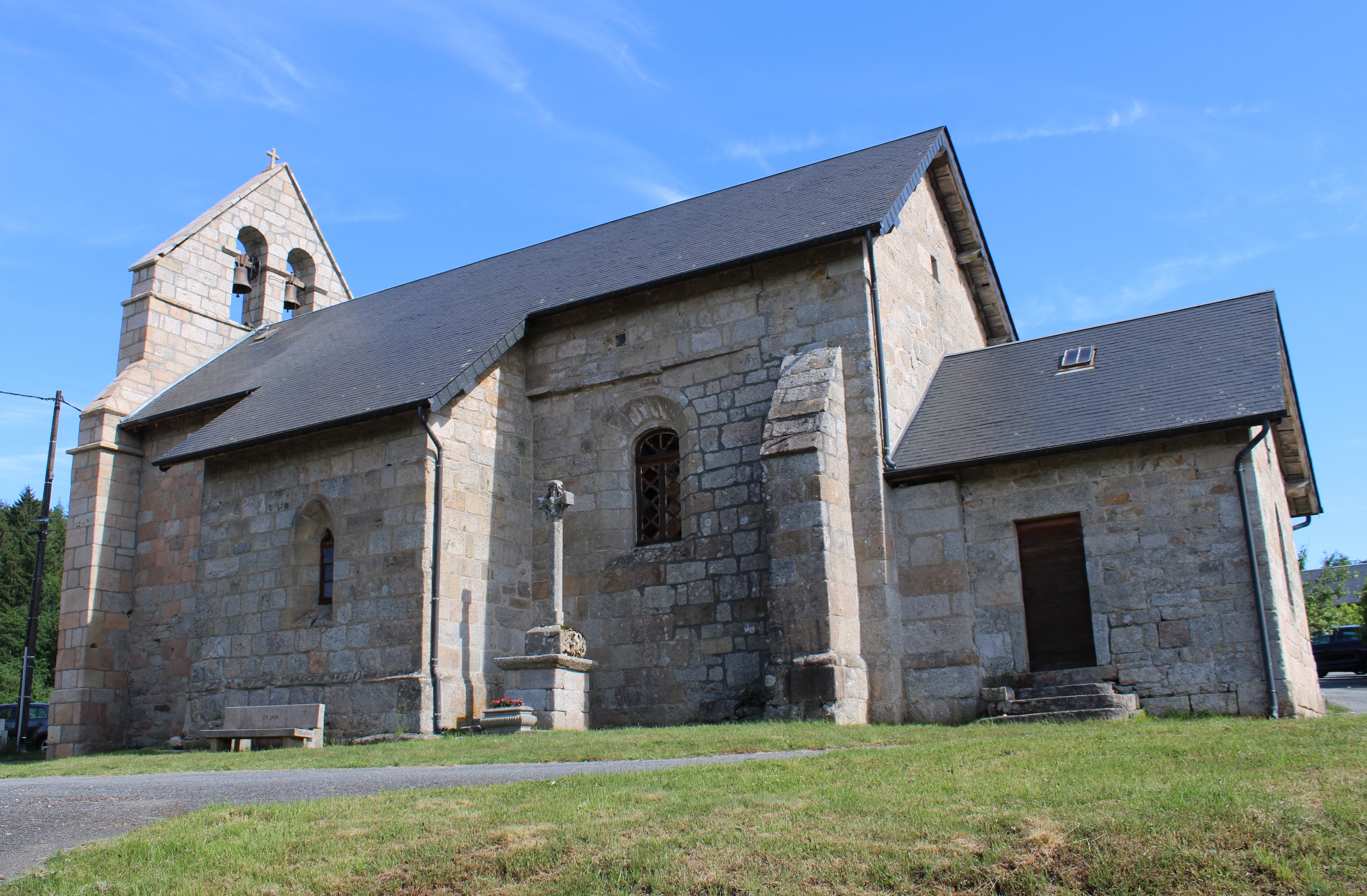
Church of Saint-Médard.

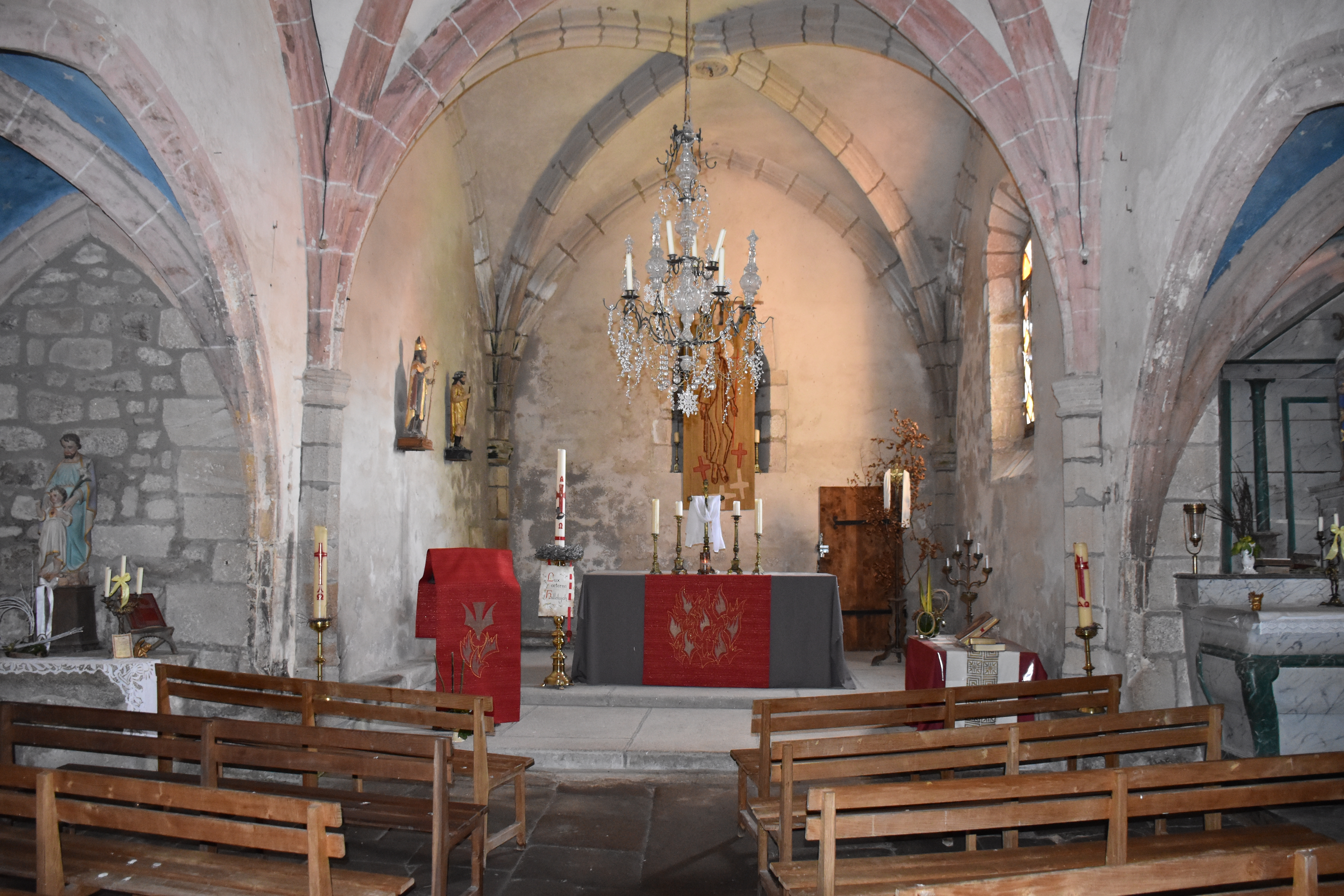
Interior of the church.

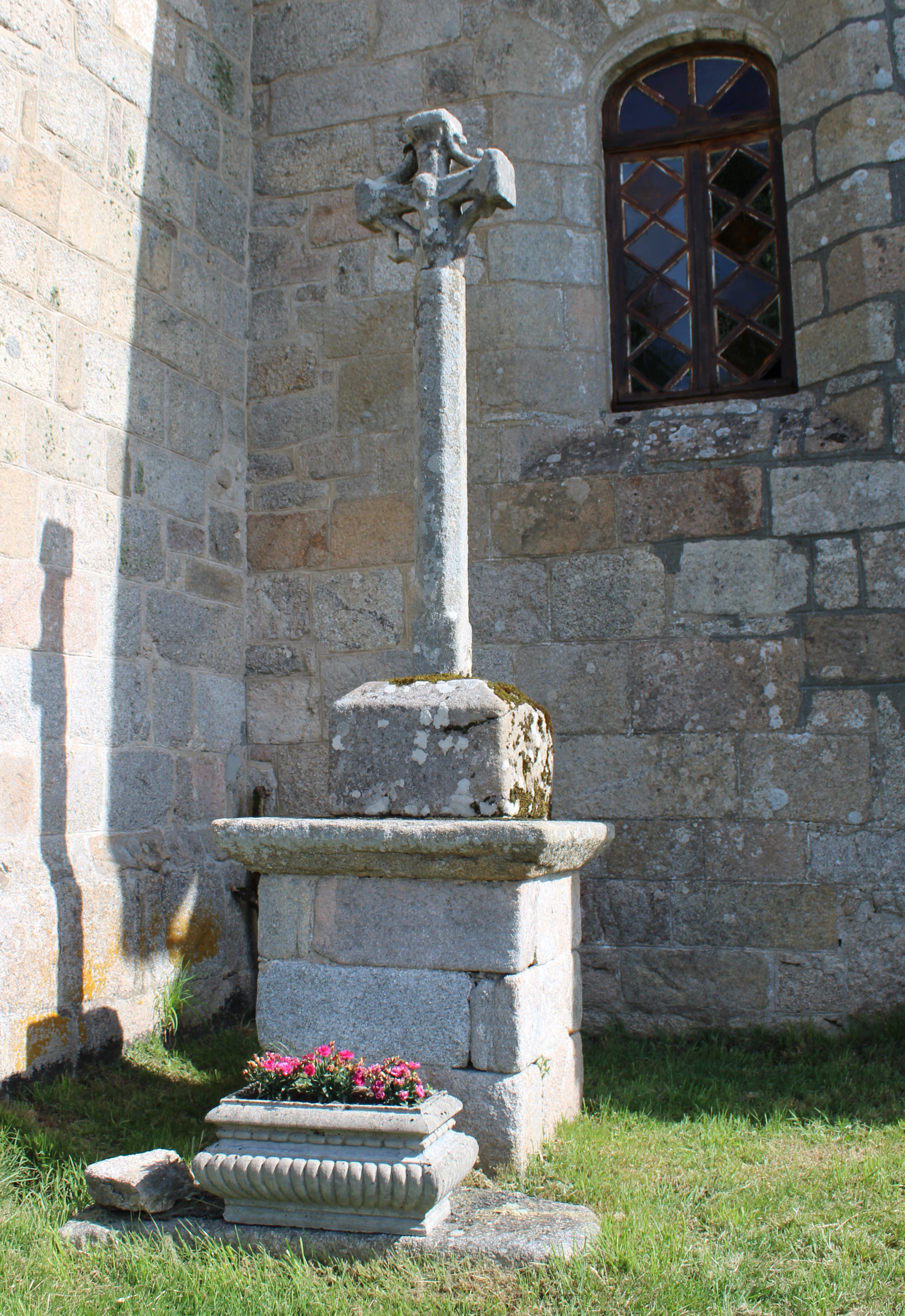
The monumental cross of the sixteenth century near the church.

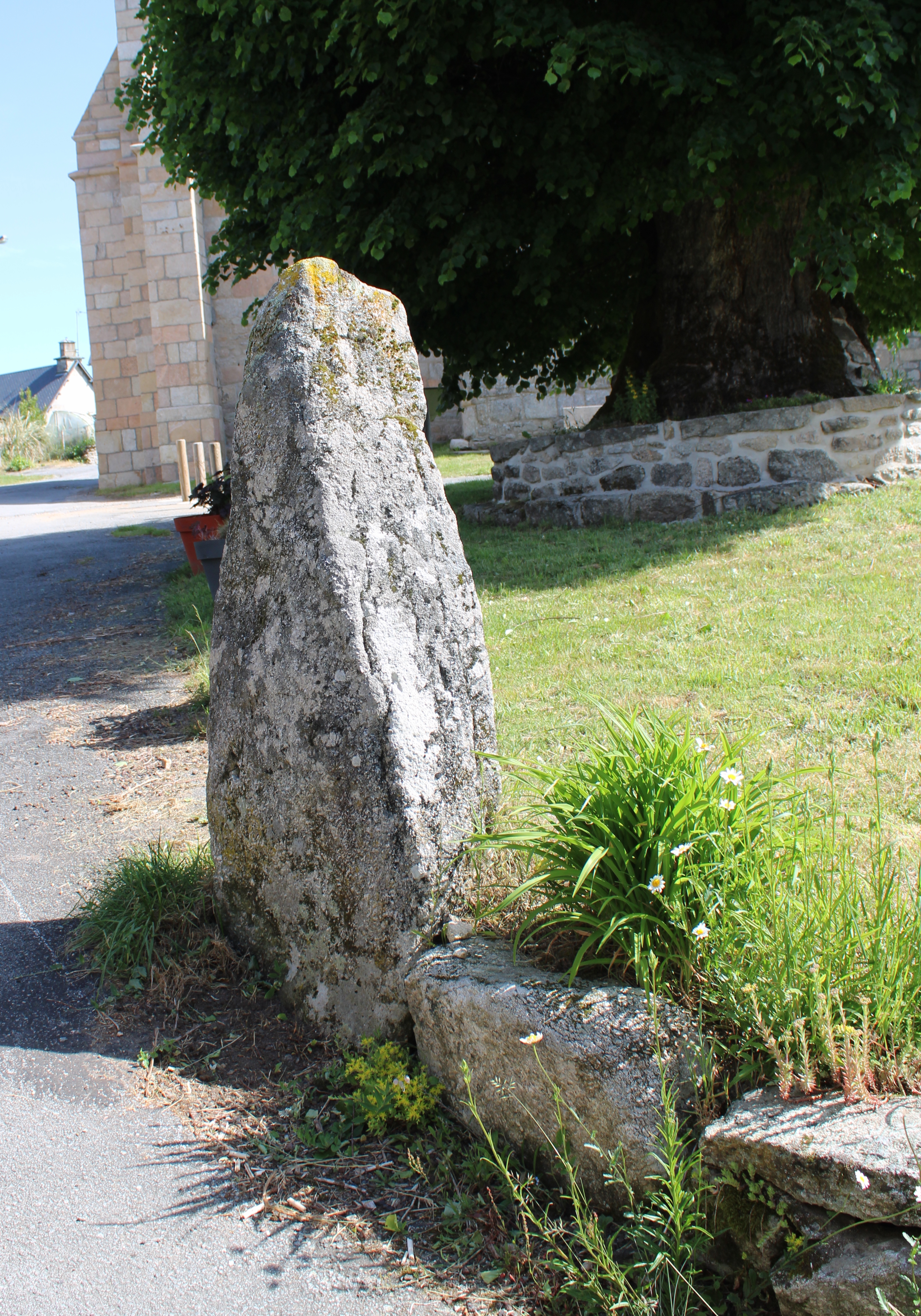
The menhir.

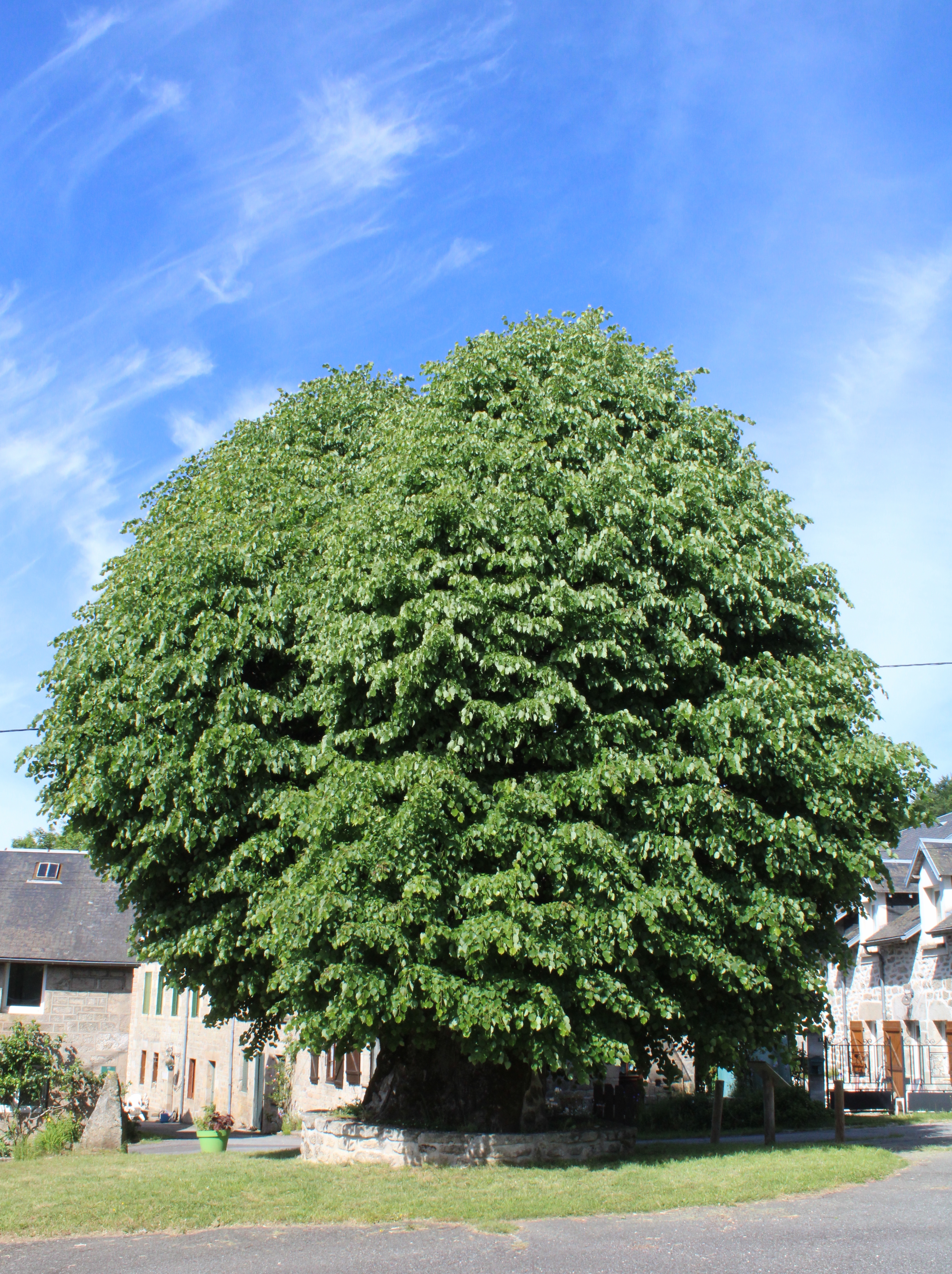
The 400-year-old Sully lime tree.

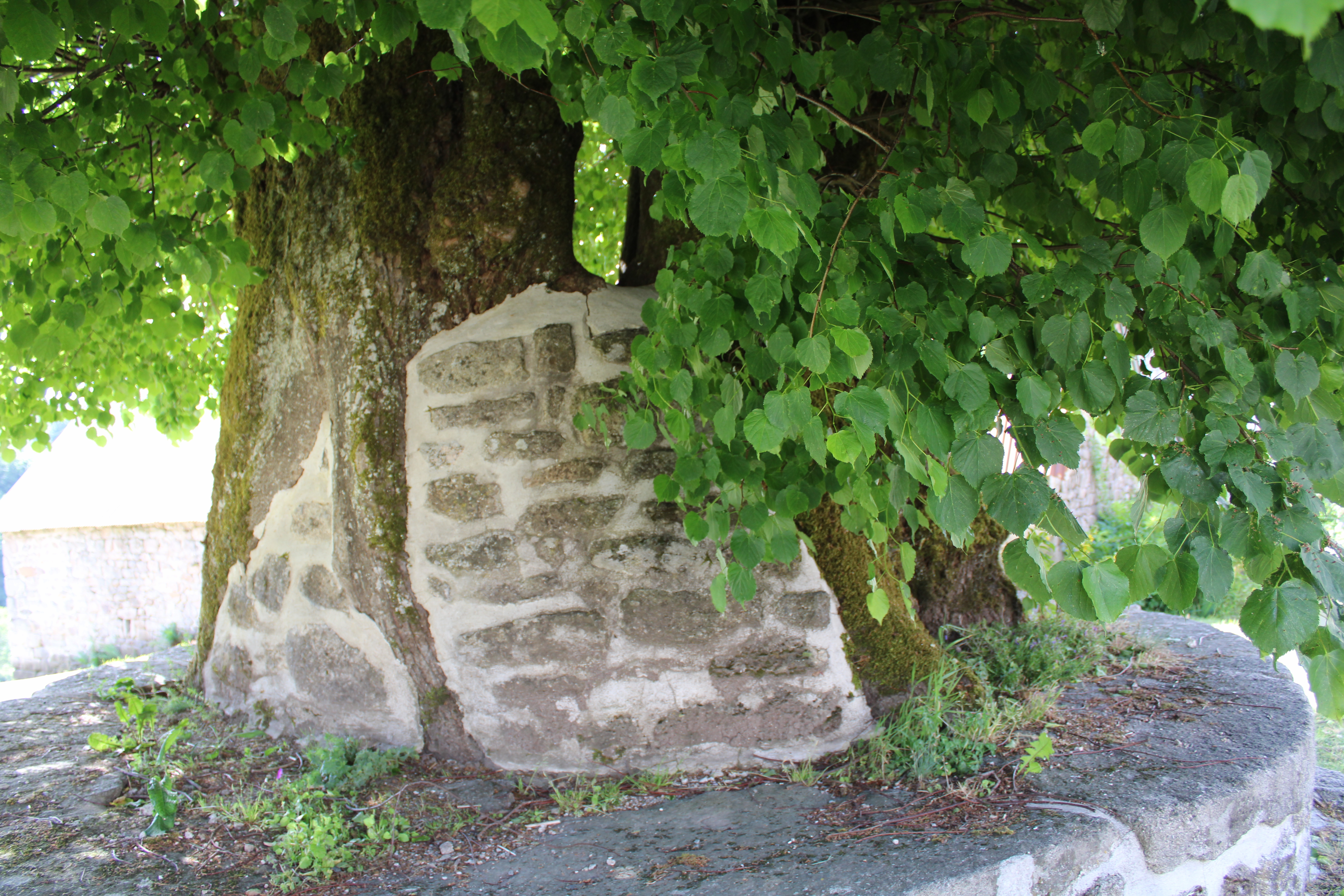
In 2016, the lime tree was the subject of consolidation work on the base of the trunk.

=== Chadebec ===
  - Menhir du Pilard - a mill and its Cistercian with a single step in Limousin, pendulum well.
  - Moulin à eau de Chadebec - a mill from 12th-century, it was part of a Cistercian barn dependent on the abbey of Aubazine. The historical interest of this mill lies in the existence of a pond and a dike, the only Cistercian construction of this type that remains in Limousin. It was restored from 2004 to 2009.
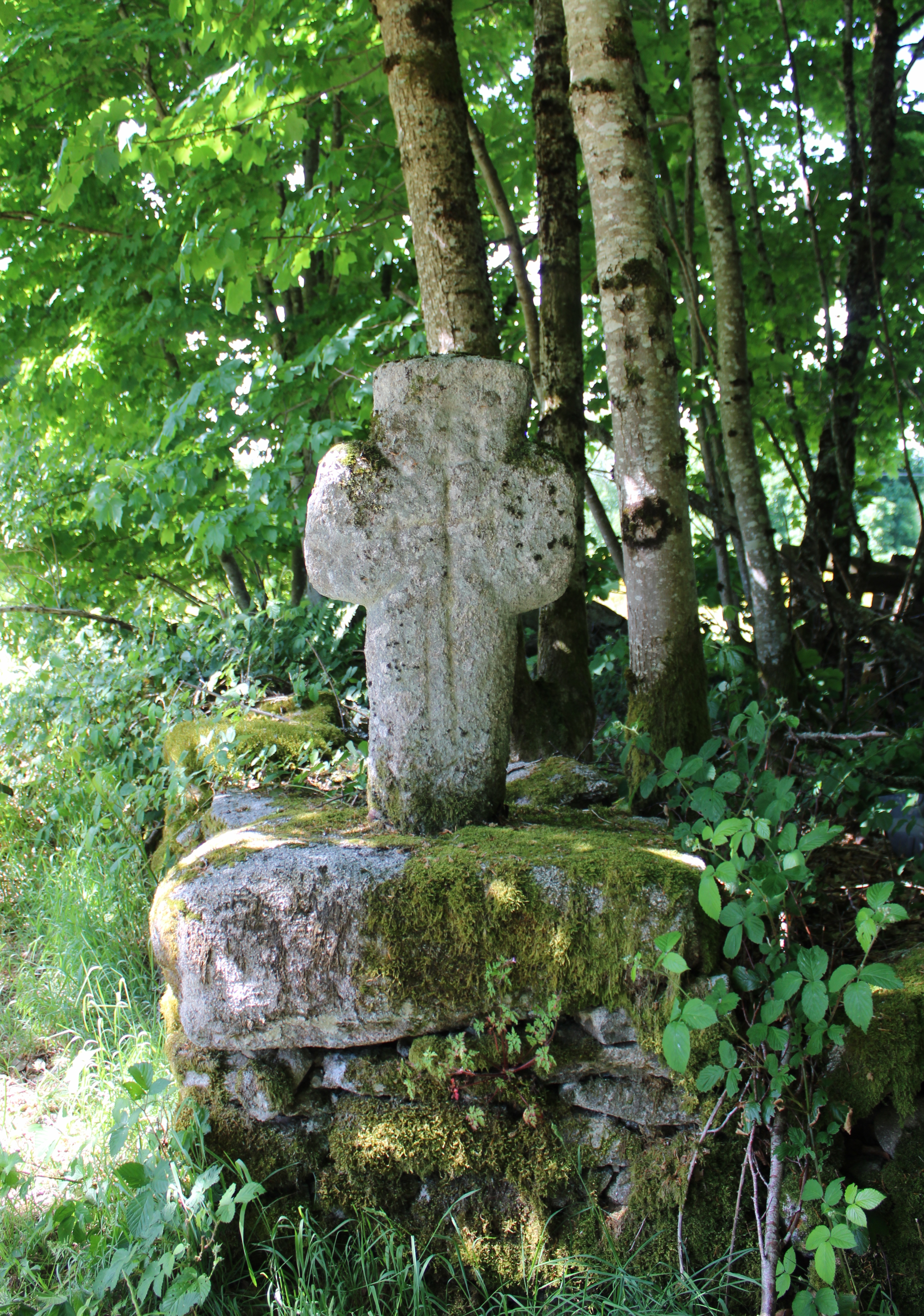
The medieval cross marks the beginning of the path taken by the monks to go to the services in Bonnefond.

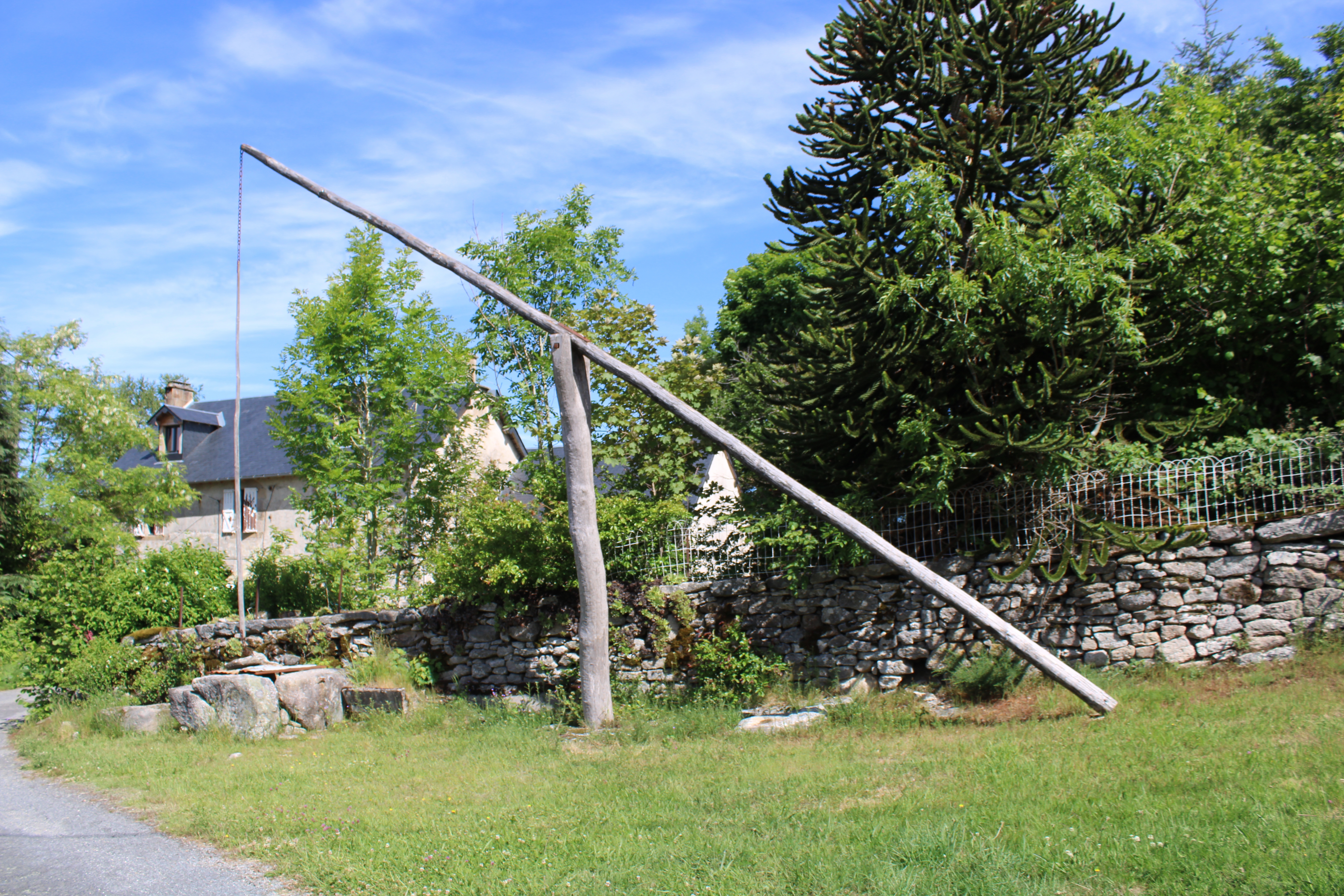
Chadebec pendulum well.

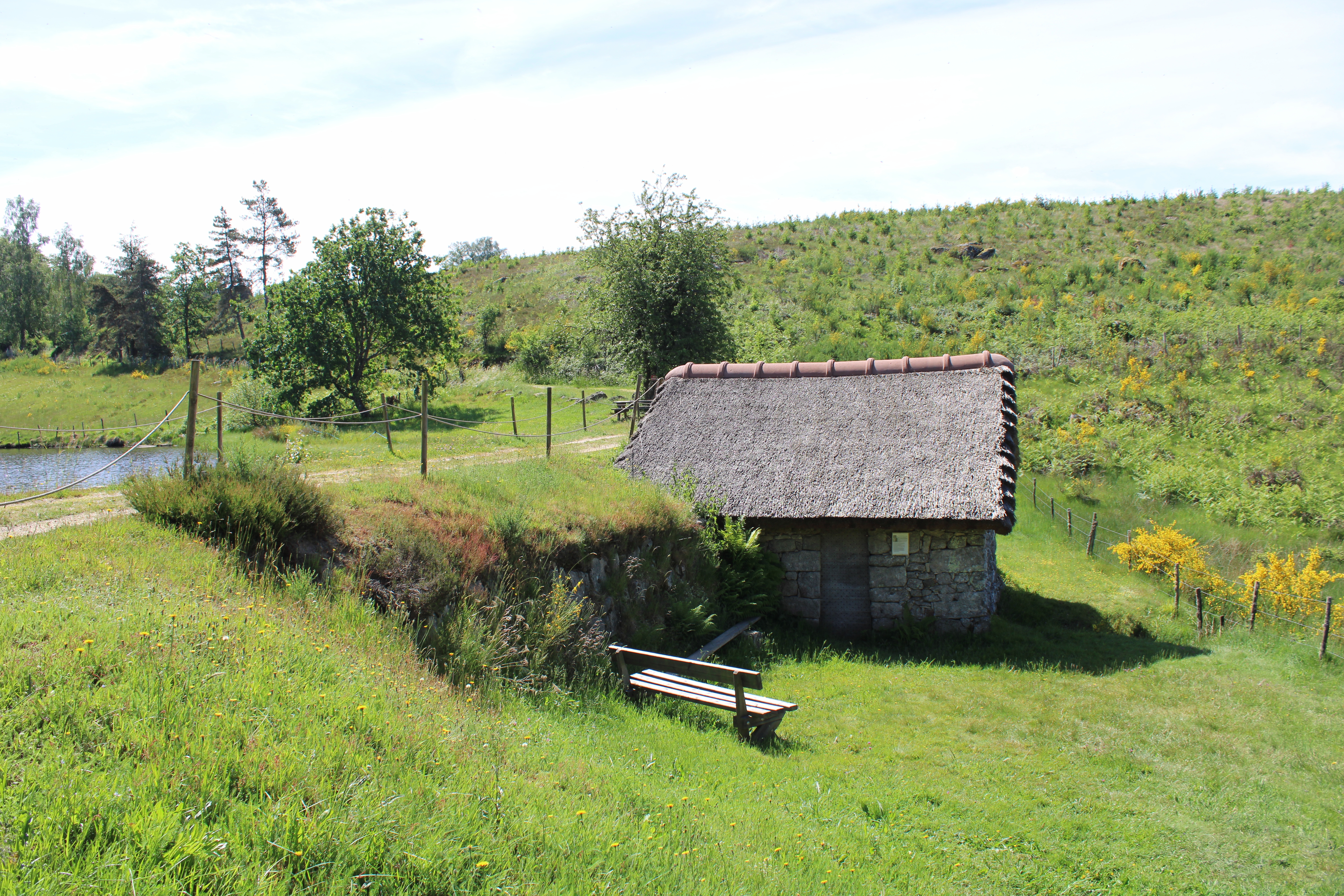
The Chadebec mill of the 12-century.

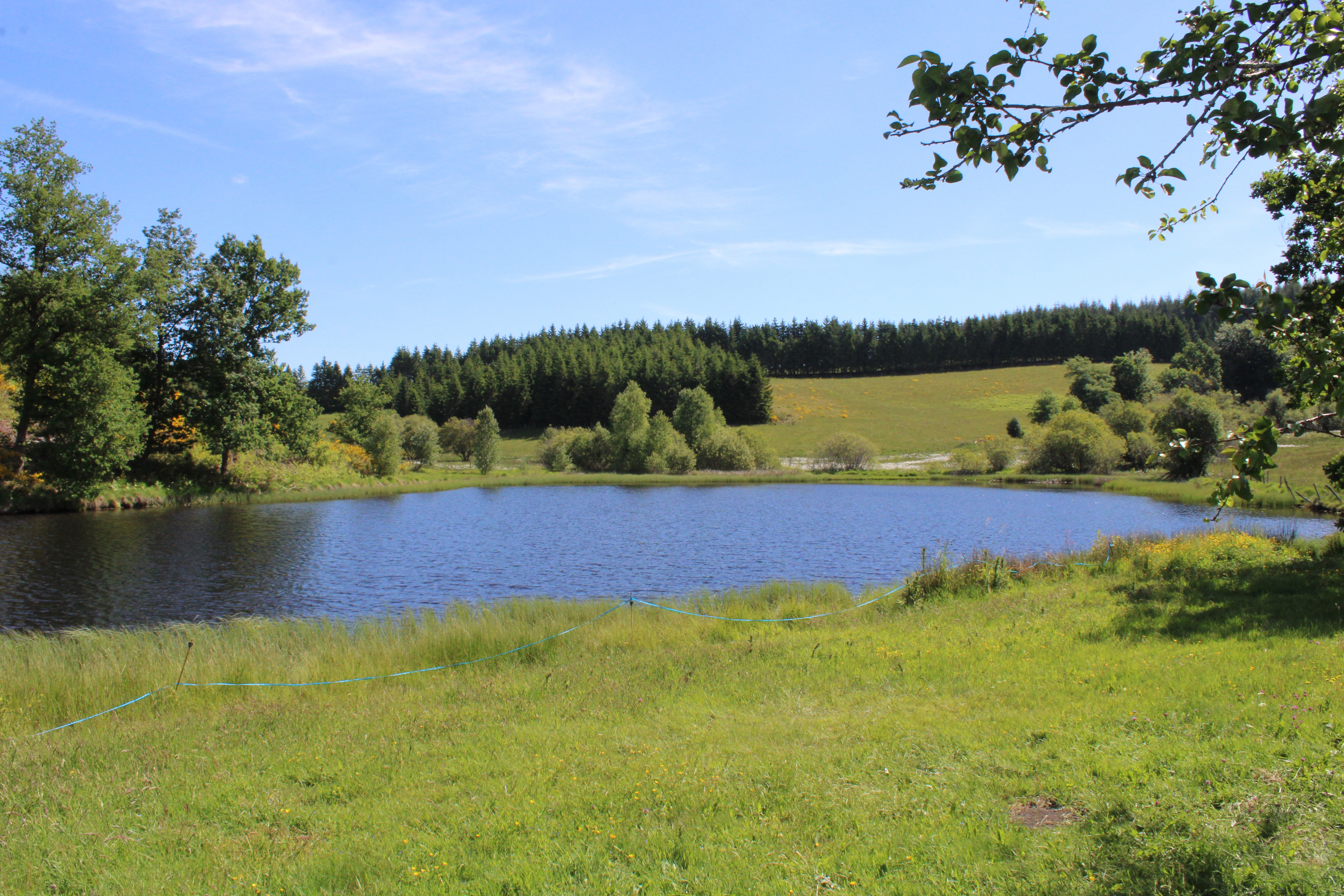
The pond, the mill's water reservoir.

=== Others ===
- Bonnefond cross-country ski resort
- Florentin :
  - ruins of the priory and a remarkable bridge over the Dadalouze (" beautiful bridge").
- At La Naucodie :
  - A cross showing Christ on the cross, legs crossed.
- At La Nouaille :
  - a cross is composed of two elements, a base dated 1650 and a small cross, symbol of the Order of Christ, which probably dates from the Middle Ages.
- In Anglard :
  - a remarkable bridge (" the water bridge") and the ruins of a manor house of which a vaulted cellar and beautiful lintels remain.
- In the woods,
  - Several burial mounds have been discovered on long-distance paths.
- In the communal cemetery there is a very beautiful fleur-de-lis cross.
- Nearby
  - The abandoned village of Clédat.

== See also ==
- Communes of the Corrèze department
