= Saint-Yrieix-le-Déjalat =

- Commune
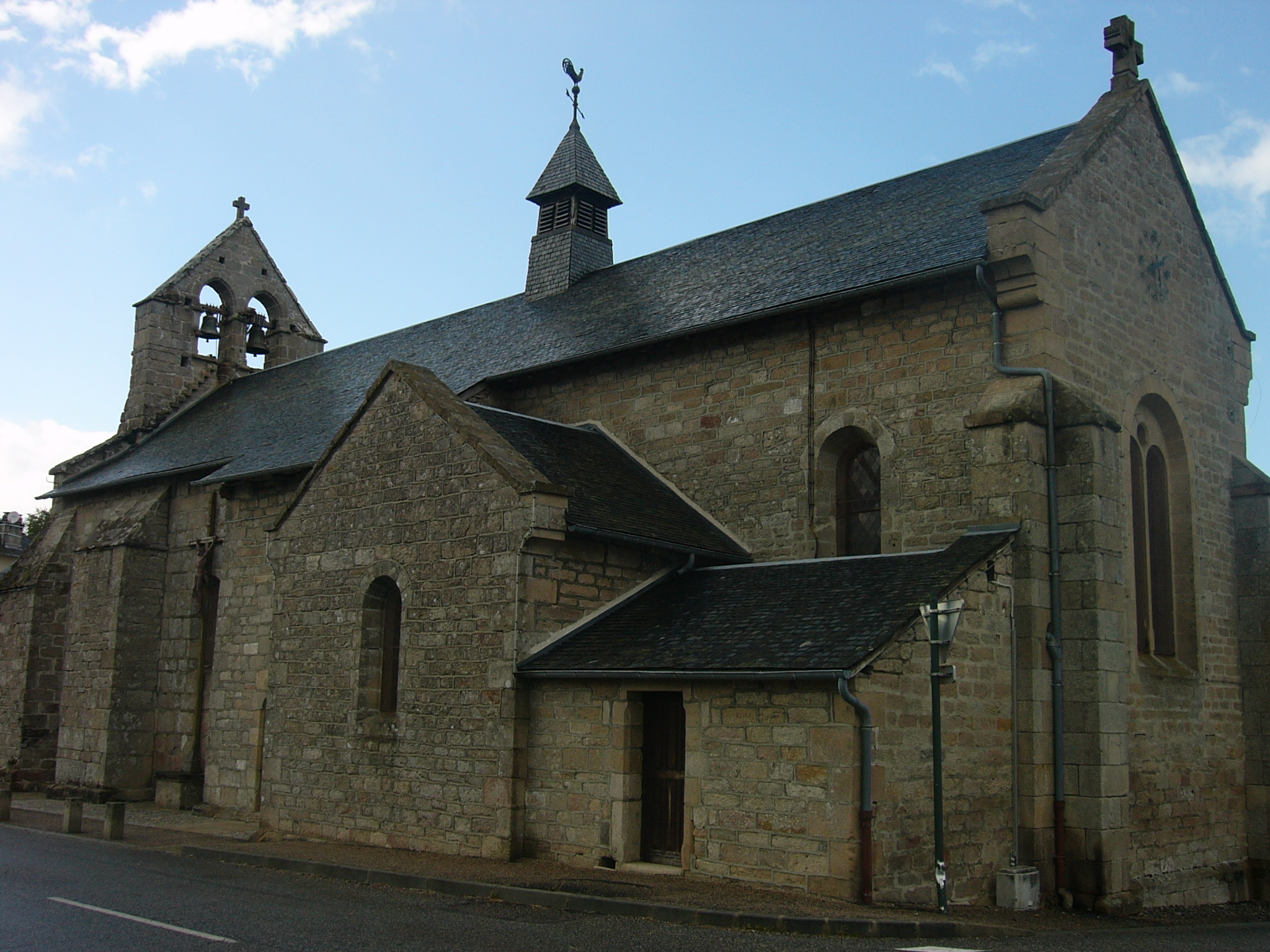
- The church in Saint-Yrieix-le-Déjalat

- Coat of arms
- Location of Saint-Yrieix-le-Déjalat
- Location within France Location within Nouvelle-Aquitaine
- Coordinates: 45°27′27″N 1°58′21″E
- Country: France
- Region: Nouvelle-Aquitaine
- Department: Corrèze
- Arrondissement: Ussel
- Canton: Égletons
- Intercommunality: Ventadour - Égletons - Monédières

Government
  - Mayor (2020–2026): Romain Chaumeil
- Area^{1}: 40.33 km^{2} (15.57 sq mi)
- Elevation: 750 m (2,460 ft)
- Highest elevation: 876 m (2,874 ft)
- Lowest elevation: 534 m (1,752 ft)
- Population (2023): 327
  - Density: 8.11/km^{2} (21.0/sq mi)
- Time zone: UTC+01:00 (CET)
  - Summer (DST): UTC+02:00 (CEST)
- INSEE/Postal code: 19249 /19300
- ^{1} French Land Register data, which excludes lakes, ponds, glaciers > 1 km^{2} (0.386 sq mi or 247 acres) and river estuaries.

Saint-Yrieix-le-Déjalat (French pronunciation: [sɛ̃.t‿iʁjɛ lə deʒala]; Occitan: Sent Iries lo Desjalat) is a commune in the Corrèze department in central France.

== Etymology ==
Saint Yrieix (Aredius), who died in 591, was a contemporary of Gregory of Tours. In Attanum he founded a monastery that is the source of the walled city of Saint-Yrieix-la-Perche. He went to the tomb of St. Julien Brioude and brought the relics, and he went very often to pray at the tomb of St. Martin at Tours. He also built churches in honor of various saints he had gone for the relics.

Under the French Revolution, to follow a decree of the Convention, the town changed its name to Yrieix le Déjalat.

== Mayors ==
List of successive mayors
Term	Name	Party
2001–2014	Yves Maison	Socialist Party
2014–2020	Noël Faugeras	
2020–incumbent	Romain Chaumeil	

== Population ==
Historical population
Year	Pop.	±% p.a.
1968	512	—
1975	461	−1.49%
1982	448	−0.41%
1990	423	−0.72%
1999	392	−0.84%
2007	402	+0.32%
2012	374	−1.43%
2017	344	−1.66%
2023	327	−0.84%
Source: INSEE

== Sights ==
- Site de Franchesse
- Maison-Forte de Montamar
- Cascades des Pradeleix
- Croix sur la place (I.S.)

== See also ==
- Communes of the Corrèze department
