= Veix =

- Commune
- Coat of arms
- Location of Veix
- Location within France Location within Nouvelle-Aquitaine
- Coordinates: 45°30′34″N 1°50′12″E
- Country: France
- Region: Nouvelle-Aquitaine
- Department: Corrèze
- Arrondissement: Tulle
- Canton: Seilhac-Monédières

Government
  - Mayor (2020–2026): Sylvie Degery
- Area^{1}: 22.14 km^{2} (8.55 sq mi)
- Highest elevation: 923 m (3,028 ft)
- Lowest elevation: 535 m (1,755 ft)
- Population (2023): 80
  - Density: 3.6/km^{2} (9.4/sq mi)
- Time zone: UTC+01:00 (CET)
  - Summer (DST): UTC+02:00 (CEST)
- INSEE/Postal code: 19281 /19260
- ^{1} French Land Register data, which excludes lakes, ponds, glaciers > 1 km^{2} (0.386 sq mi or 247 acres) and river estuaries.

Veix is a commune in the Corrèze department in central France.

== Population ==
Historical population
Year	Pop.	±% p.a.
1968	194	—
1975	146	−3.98%
1982	110	−3.96%
1990	80	−3.90%
1999	72	−1.16%
2007	71	−0.17%
2012	70	−0.28%
2017	67	−0.87%
2023	80	+3.00%
Source: INSEE

== See also ==
- Communes of the Corrèze department
