= Puy de Sancy =

Mountain in France

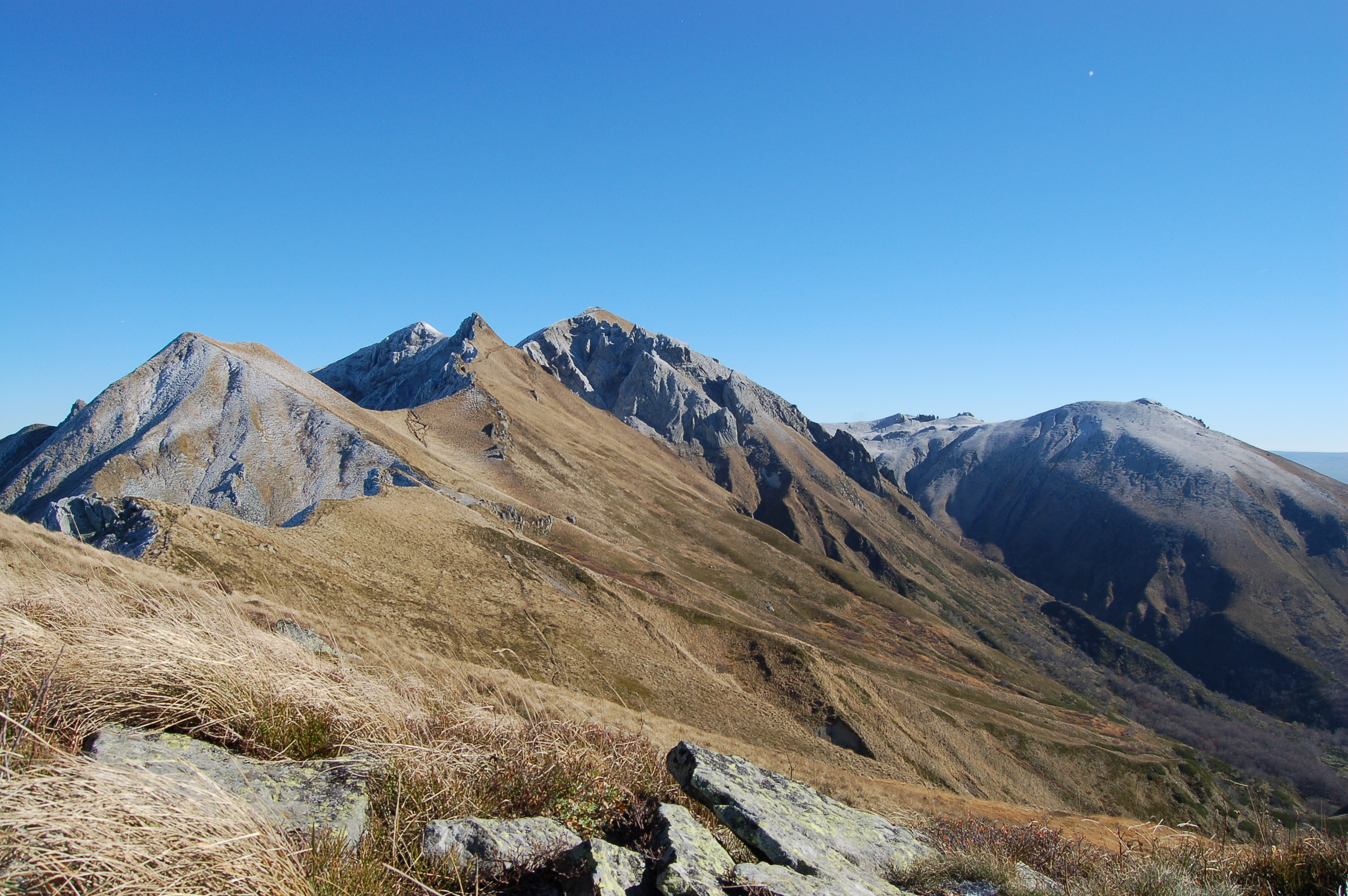

Highest point
- Elevation: 1,885 m (6,184 ft)
- Prominence: 1,579 m (5,180 ft)
- Isolation: 221.3 km (137.5 mi) to P.1958
- Listing: Ultra, Ribu
- Coordinates: 45°31′42″N 2°48′51″E

Naming
- Native name: Puèi de la Crotz (Occitan)

Geography
- Location within France Location within Europe
- Location: Puy-de-Dôme departement, France
- Parent range: Monts Dore (Massif Central)

Puy de Sancy (US: /ˌpwiː də sɒ̃ˈsiː/, French: [pɥi d(ə) sɑ̃si]; Auvergnat: Puèi de la Crotz [ˈpœj də lɔ ˈkɾu(ts)], lit. ''Mount of the Cross'') is the highest mountain in the Massif Central, in Puy-de-Dôme departement of south central France. It is part of an ancient stratovolcano which has been inactive for about 220,000 years.

== Mountain ==
The northern and southern slopes are used for skiing, and a number of cable cars and ski lifts ascend the mountain. Skiing has been practised on the mountain since the early 20th century; two local priests traversed the Puy de Sancy on skis in 1905. In 1936, a cable car link was built from Mont-Dore to one of the needles just below the summit. On Christmas Day in late 1965, a cable car accident on a newer line injured ten passengers and killed seven others. Super-Besse is another ski resort, located on the southwestern slope.

The valley to the north is also the source of two streams called Dore and Dogne, which unite to form the Dordogne, which flows through the nearby spa town of Mont-Dore and on to the Gironde estuary.

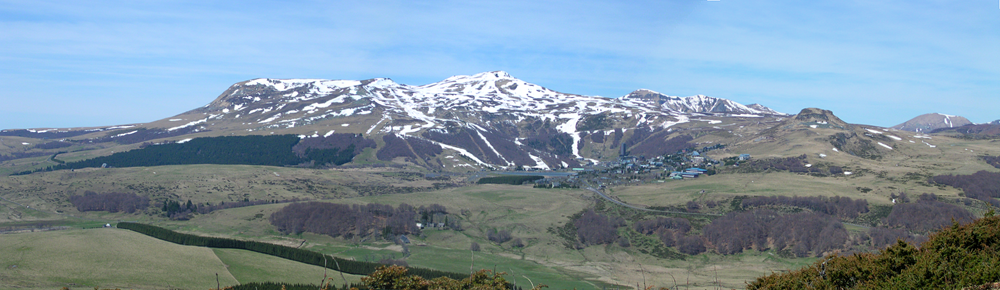
Puy de Sancy from the south

== Sources ==
- Cattermole, Peter (2001), Auvergne, Classic Geology in Europe, vol. 2, Terra Publishing, ISBN 1-903544-05-X.
