= Auriac, Corrèze =

Auriac
- Commune
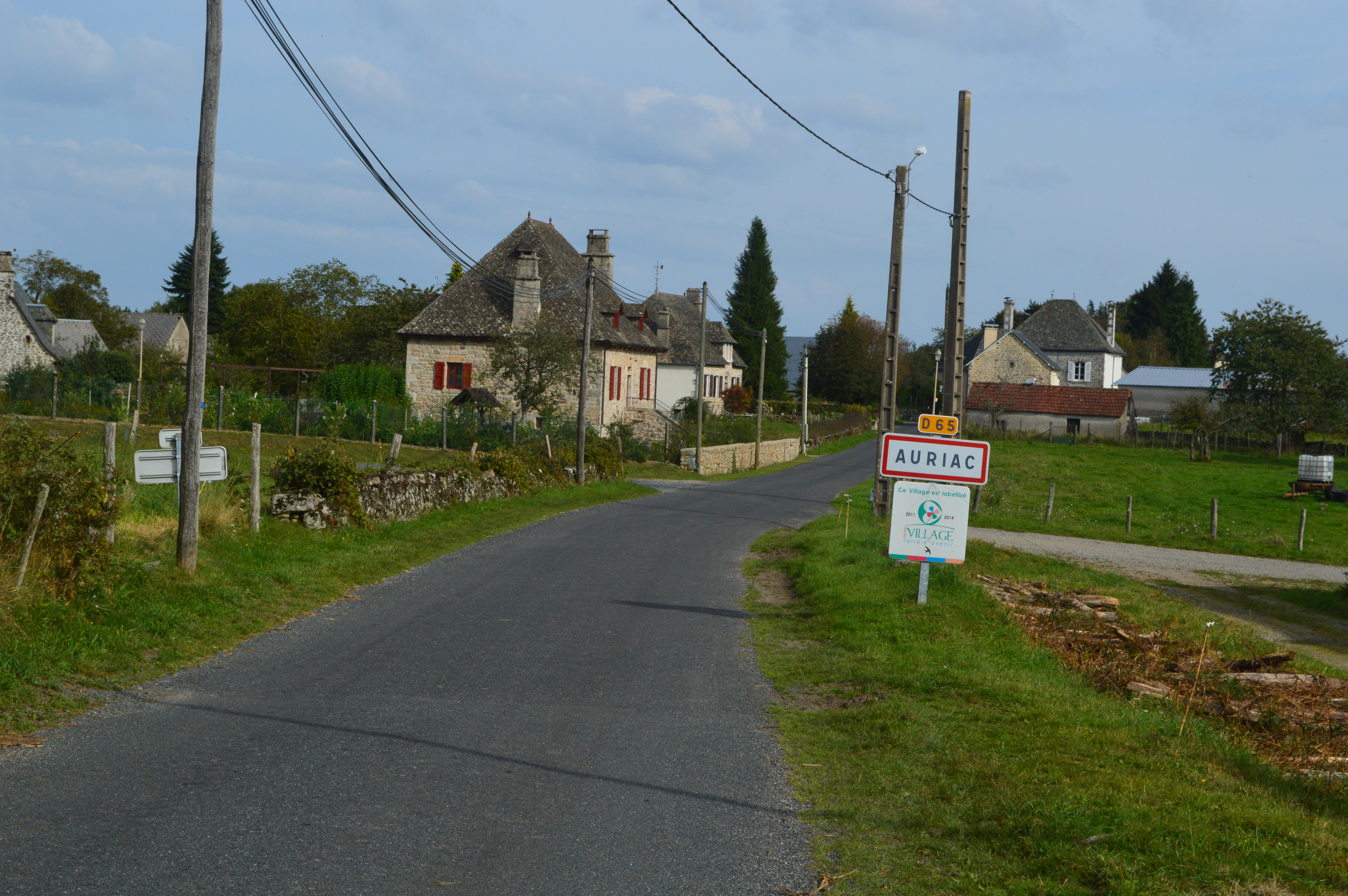
- The road into Auriac

- Coat of arms
- Location of Auriac
- Location within France Location within Nouvelle-Aquitaine
- Coordinates: 45°12′13″N 2°09′00″E
- Country: France
- Region: Nouvelle-Aquitaine
- Department: Corrèze
- Arrondissement: Tulle
- Canton: Argentat-sur-Dordogne
- Intercommunality: CC Xaintrie Val'Dordogne

Government
  - Mayor (2020–2026): Nicole Bardi
- Area^{1}: 34.89 km^{2} (13.47 sq mi)
- Elevation: 600 m (2,000 ft)
- Highest elevation: 687 m (2,254 ft)
- Lowest elevation: 249 m (817 ft)
- Population (2023): 216
  - Density: 6.19/km^{2} (16.0/sq mi)
- Time zone: UTC+01:00 (CET)
  - Summer (DST): UTC+02:00 (CEST)
- INSEE/Postal code: 19014 /19220
- ^{1} French Land Register data, which excludes lakes, ponds, glaciers > 1 km^{2} (0.386 sq mi or 247 acres) and river estuaries.

Auriac (French pronunciation: [oʁjak]) is a commune in the Corrèze department in the Nouvelle-Aquitaine region of central France.

== Geography ==
Auriac is located in the Massif Central on the left bank of the Dordogne some 50 km east of Brive-la-Gaillarde and 30 km south by south-east of Égletons. The D13 road from Bassignac-le-Haut to Saint-Merd-de-Lapleau passes through the north-western corner of the commune. The D65 branches off the D13 in the commune and goes south-east to the village then continues south-east to join the D145 just west of Rilhac-Xaintrie. The D111 branches from the D65 south of the village and goes to Saint-Julien-aux-Bois in the south. The D72 branches from the D111 in the south of the commune and goes north-west to Bassignac-le-Haut with the D75 branching off it in the commune and going to Servières-le-Château in the south-west. Apart from the village there are the hamlets of La Vedrenne, Anjoux, Le Mons, Dezejouls, Chadirac, Selves, Job, Lalo, Labouldoire, Verchapie, and Rigieix. About 60% of the land area is forested with the rest farmland.

The Dordogne river forms the entire northern border of the commune with many streams rising in the commune and flowing north to join it including the Ruisseau de la Cascade with its tributary the Ruisseau de Selves, the Ruisseau de Murat, the Ruisseau des Bialles, and the Ruisseau de Valette with its tributaries the Ruisseau de Longuechaux and the Ruisseau de Courpou which forms much of the south-eastern border.

== Toponymy ==
Old forms of the name Auriac come from a Latin man's name Aureus which was Auriaco in 1105.

== History ==
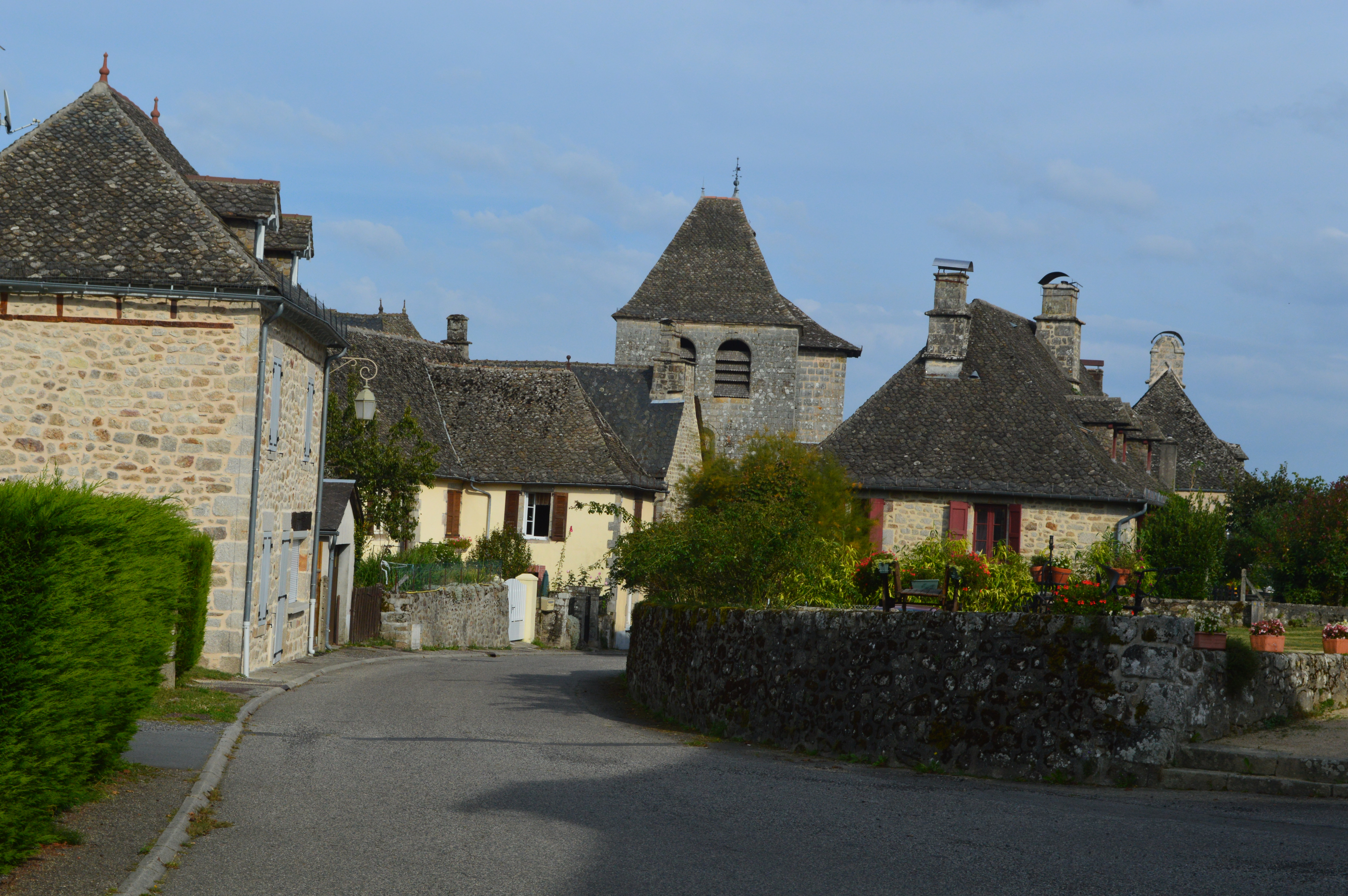
A street in Auriac

Auriac has been inhabited since prehistory

In the 12th century Stephen of Obazine and Cistercian monks from Obazine Abbey founded the Abbey of la Valette in Auriac. The construction of the Barrage de Chastang from 1947-1952 resulted in the submersion of the remains of the Abbey.

In the 13th century the Benedictine Abbey of Saint-Géraud of Aurillac established a priory in the commune with the Prior having the right of high justice with a chateau of which there are remains of the Keep still standing.

=== Heraldry ===
Arms of Auriac	The official status of the blazon remains to be determined. Blazon: Or, a lion of Gules.

== Administration ==
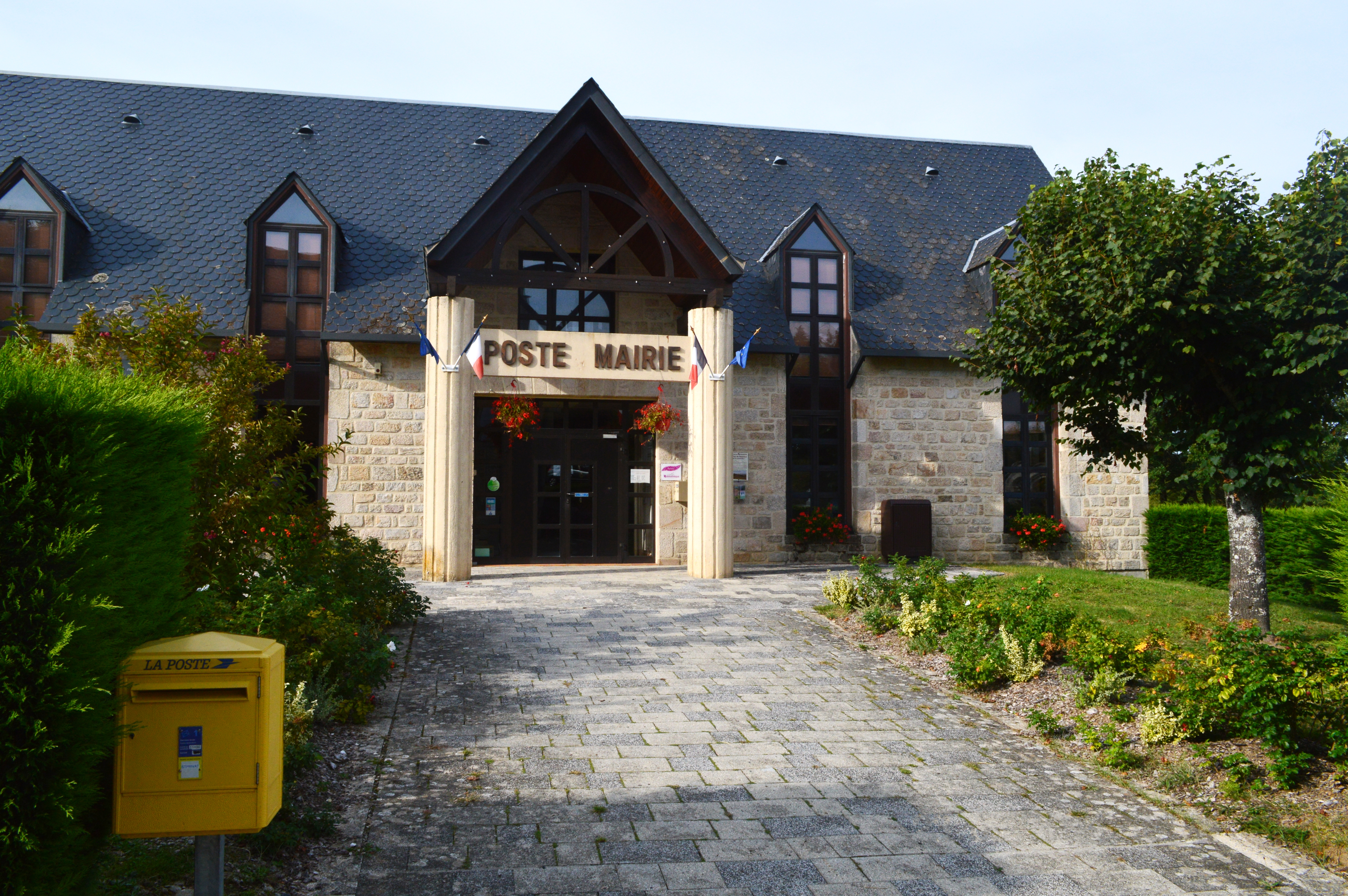
The Town Hall

List of Successive Mayors

From	To	Name
2001	2008	Bernard Selves
2008	2026	Nicole Bardi

== Demography ==
The inhabitants of the commune are known as Auriacois or Auriacoises in French.

Historical population

Year	Pop.	±% p.a.
1793	1,290	—
1800	967	−4.03%
1806	1,127	+2.58%
1821	1,145	+0.11%
1831	1,277	+1.10%
1836	1,353	+1.16%
1841	1,302	−0.77%
1846	1,333	+0.47%
1851	1,385	+0.77%
1856	1,413	+0.40%
1861	1,314	−1.44%
1866	1,333	+0.29%
1872	1,200	−1.74%
1876	1,212	+0.25%
1881	1,181	−0.52%
1886	1,151	−0.51%
1891	1,020	−2.39%
1896	982	−0.76%
1901	908	−1.55%

Year	Pop.	±% p.a.
1906	935	+0.59%
1911	900	−0.76%
1921	815	−0.99%
1926	752	−1.60%
1931	689	−1.73%
1936	708	+0.55%
1946	612	−1.45%
1954	518	−2.06%
1962	457	−1.55%
1968	377	−3.16%
1975	305	−2.98%
1982	287	−0.87%
1990	250	−1.71%
1999	215	−1.66%
2007	218	+0.17%
2012	231	+1.17%
2017	229	−0.17%
2023	216	−0.97%

Source: EHESS and INSEE

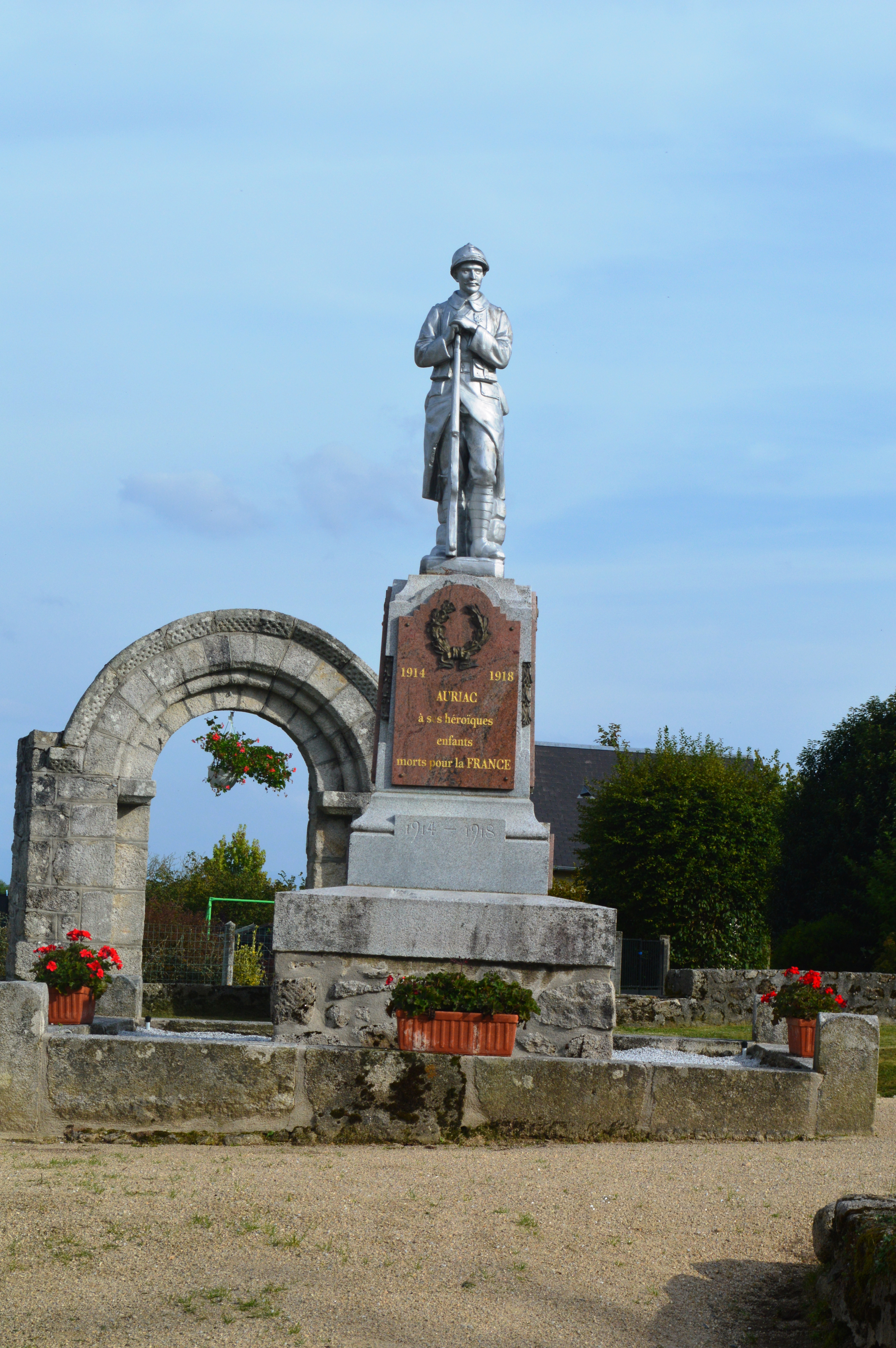
Auriac War Memorial

== Economy ==
Salers cattle are raised in the commune.

== Local culture and heritage ==
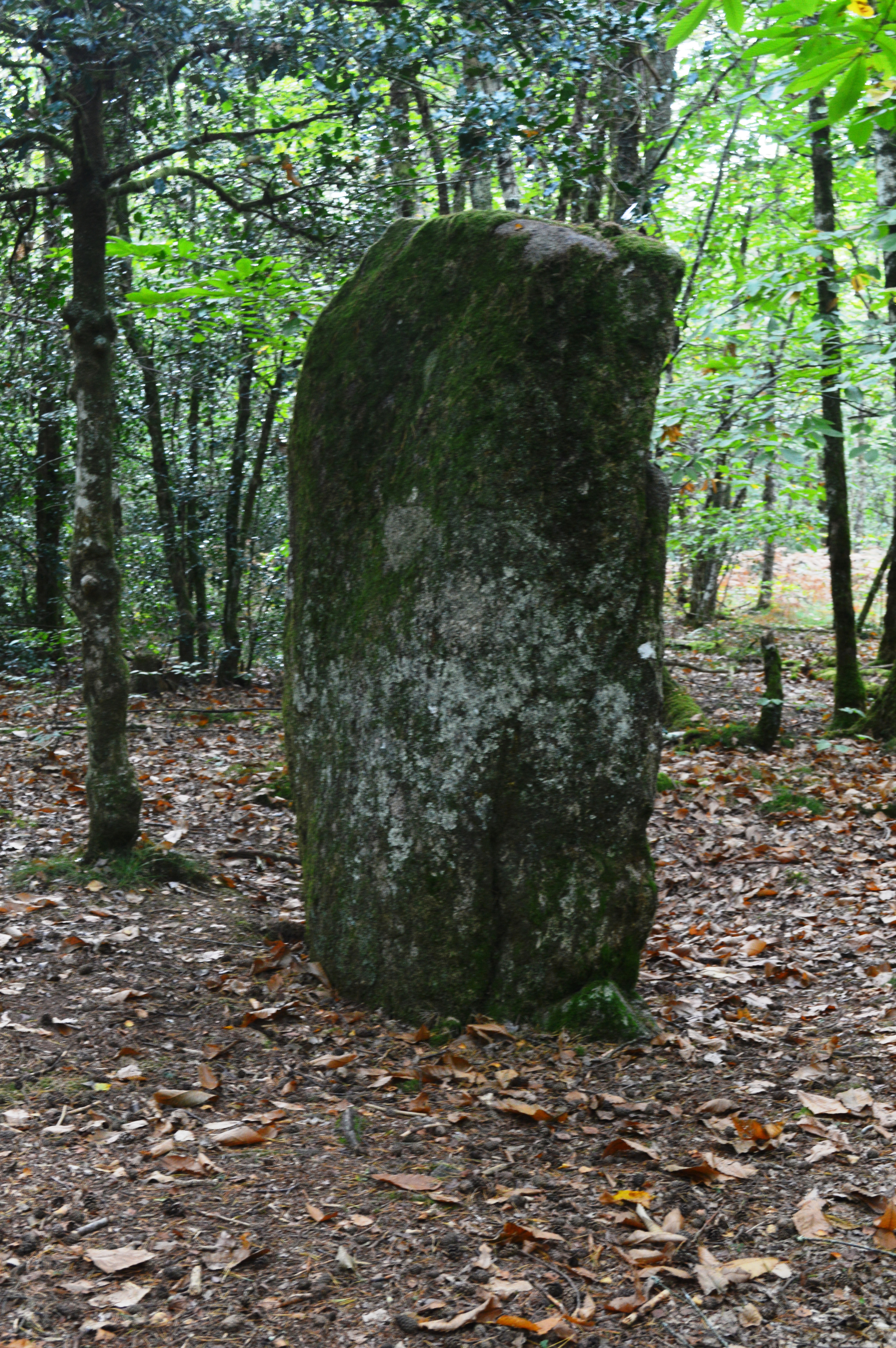
The Menhir of Selves

=== Civil heritage ===
- Camping at the artificial lake
- Redenat Waterfall
- A Tumulus at Puy-de-Valette
- The Menhir of Selves
- A House near the remains of the Keep which was the home of the former Prior.
- Panoramic view at Puy-du-Bassin
- The Dordogne Valley.
- The Confluence of the Luzège.

Since 2013 there has been a Natural Heritage Interpretation path which leads to the top of the Xaintrie at Puy du Bassin from the town centre.

=== Religious heritage ===
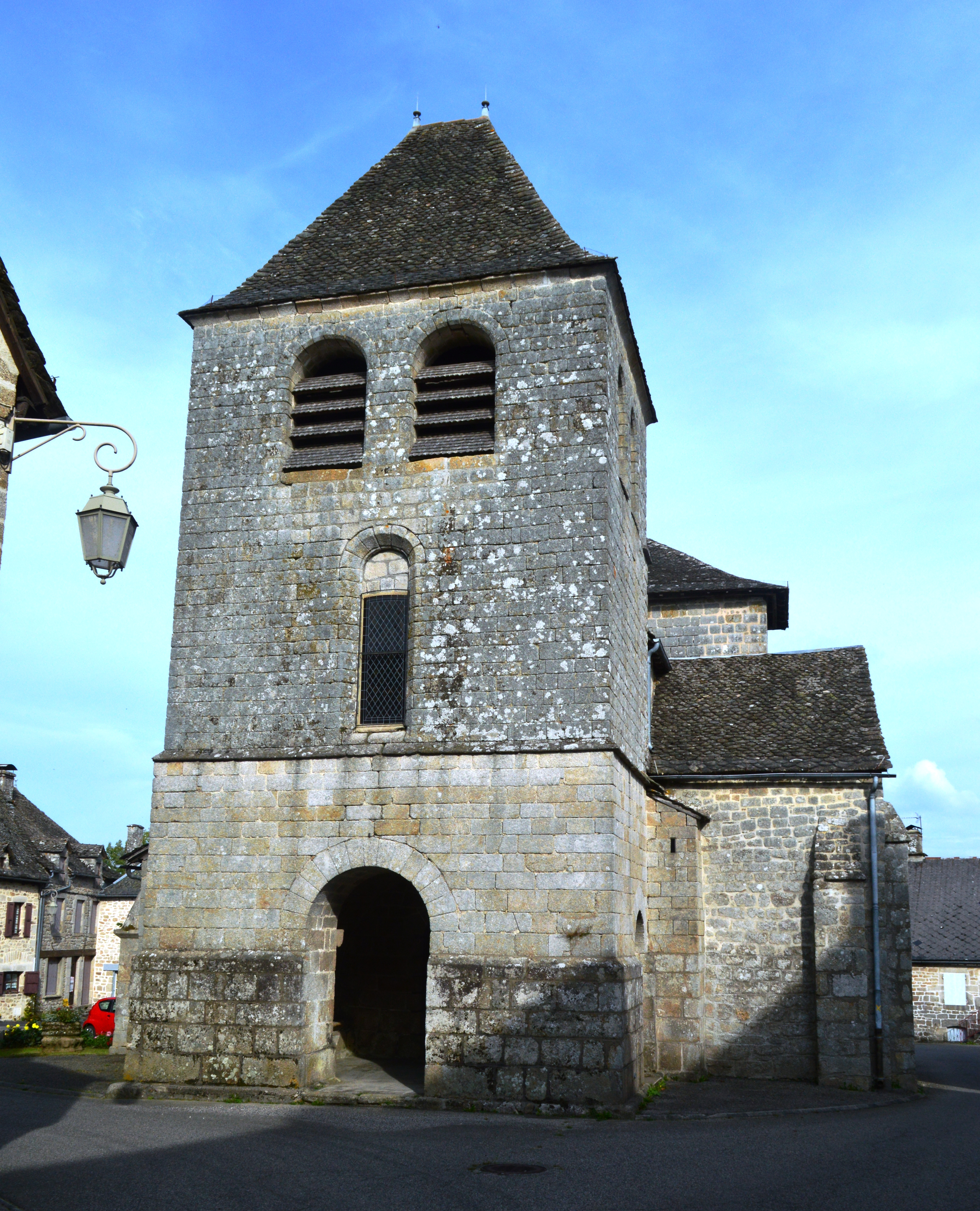
The Church of Saint-Côme Saint-Damien

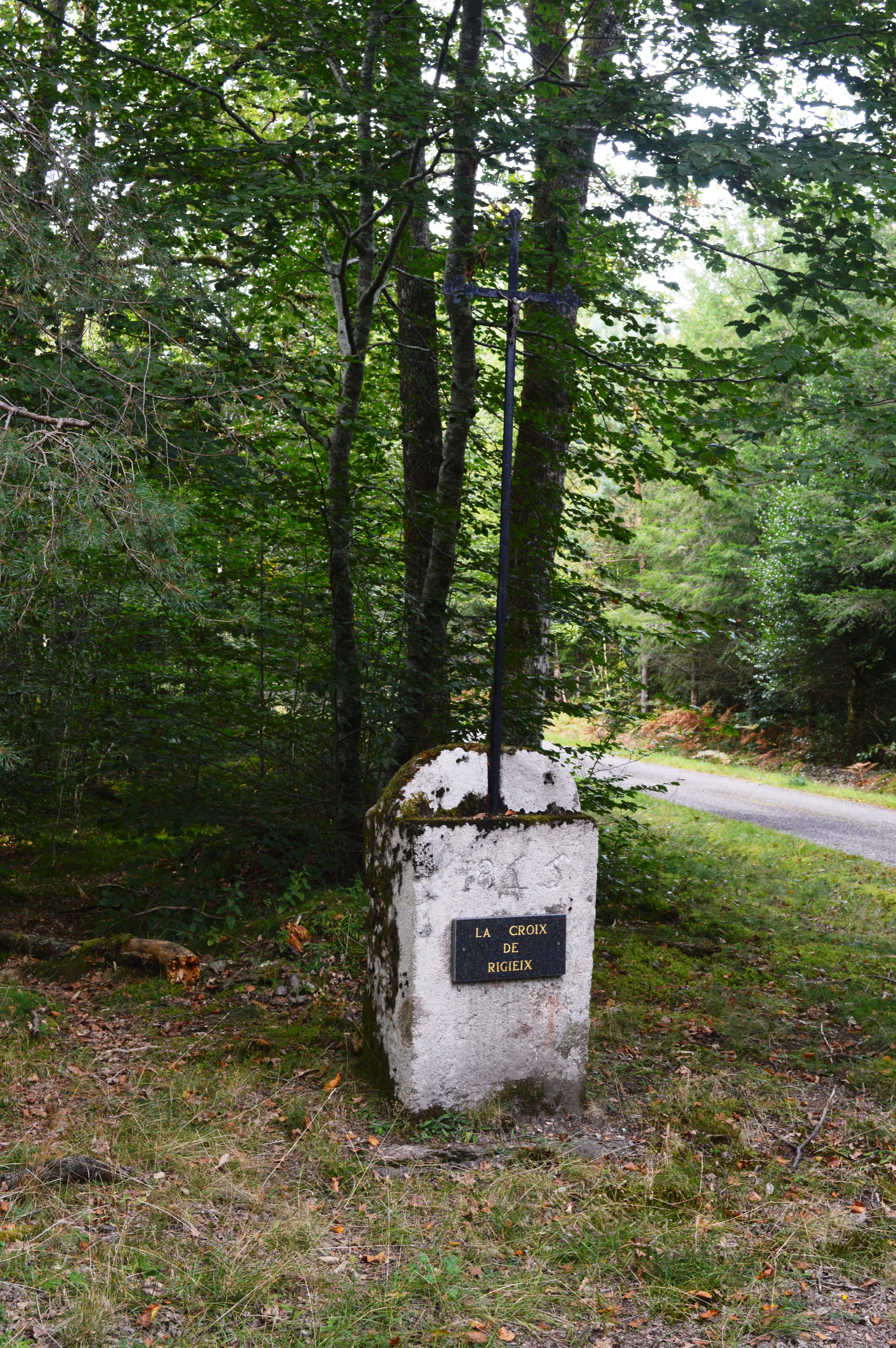
A Wayside Cross in Auriac

- The remains of the abbey of Valletta from the 12th century are submerged in the lake behind the Chastang Dam.
- The Chapel of Puy du Bassin (at an altitude of 707 m)
- A Church (15th-16th century)
- The Chapel Dézéjouls (19th century).
- The Chapel Notre-Dame-de-Chastres at Cours (19th century).
- A Monumental granite cross (19th century).
- A Wayside Cross (15th century).
- The Church of Saint-Côme Saint-Damien (12th century), which was the former priory, is registered as a historical monument. The church contains two items which are registered as historical objects:
  - A Collection plate: the Annunciation (16th century)
  - A Eucharistic Cross (17th century)

== See also ==
- Communes of the Corrèze department
