= Bassignac-le-Bas =

- Commune
- Coat of arms
- Location of Bassignac-le-Bas
- Location within France Location within Nouvelle-Aquitaine
- Coordinates: 45°01′12″N 1°51′12″E
- Country: France
- Region: Nouvelle-Aquitaine
- Department: Corrèze
- Arrondissement: Tulle
- Canton: Argentat-sur-Dordogne

Government
  - Mayor (2020–2026): Jean-Pierre Lasserre
- Area^{1}: 12.29 km^{2} (4.75 sq mi)
- Elevation: 250 m (820 ft)
- Highest elevation: 517 m (1,696 ft)
- Lowest elevation: 145 m (476 ft)
- Population (2023): 80
  - Density: 6.5/km^{2} (17/sq mi)
- Time zone: UTC+01:00 (CET)
  - Summer (DST): UTC+02:00 (CEST)
- INSEE/Postal code: 19017 /19430
- ^{1} French Land Register data, which excludes lakes, ponds, glaciers > 1 km^{2} (0.386 sq mi or 247 acres) and river estuaries.

Bassignac-le-Bas (French pronunciation: [basiɲak lə ba]; Occitan: Bassinhac de Debas) is a commune in the Corrèze department in the Nouvelle-Aquitaine region of south-central France.

== History ==
Bassignac-le-Bas appears as Baßignac le Bas on the 1750 Cassini Map and as Bafignac leBas on the 1790 version.

=== Heraldry ===
Arms of Bassignac-le-Bas	The official status of the blazon remains to be determined. Blazon: Azure, 3 bends of Or, a canton bendy of Or and Gules of 12.

== Geography ==
Bassignac-le-Bas is located some 30 km south-east of Brive-la-Gaillarde and 10 km south-west of Argentat. Access to the commune is by the D116 which comes from Argentat in the north-east and passes along the riverbank through the commune before continuing south to join the D940 at Beaulieu-sur-Dordogne. The D41 from Beaulieu-sur-Dordogne to La Chapelle-Saint-Géraud passes through the south-west of the commune. The D136 comes from Brivezac across the river and passes through the commune eastwards to join the D41 in the east of the commune. Apart from the village there are the hamlets of Vaurs, Recoudier, Le Peuch, Culagne, Chaviolle, La Gendrie, Le Gasquet, Brette, and La Laurie in the commune. The commune is mixed forest and farmland.

The Dordogne river forms the western and northern borders of the commune as it flows south to eventually join the Garonne at Bayon-sur-Gironde. The Ruisseau de la Borie flows from a small lake in the east of the commune westwards to join the Dordogne. The Ruisseau de Layssot forms the north-eastern border of the commune as it flows north to join the Dordogne. The Ruisseau de Chauvac forms the southern border of the commune as it flows west to join the Dordogne.

== Demography ==
The inhabitants of the commune are known as Bassignacois or Bassignacoises in French.

Historical population

Year	Pop.	±% p.a.
1793	600	—
1821	506	−0.61%
1846	635	+0.91%
1872	600	−0.22%
1901	557	−0.26%
1926	425	−1.08%
1946	267	−2.30%
1962	254	−0.31%
1968	212	−2.97%

Year	Pop.	±% p.a.
1975	165	−3.52%
1982	156	−0.80%
1990	132	−2.07%
1999	105	−2.51%
2007	94	−1.37%
2012	91	−0.65%
2017	91	+0.00%
2023	80	−2.12%

Source: EHESS and INSEE

== Local government ==
List of Successive Mayors

From	To	Name
2001	2026	Jean-Pierre Lasserre

== Culture and heritage ==
=== Religious heritage ===
The Parish Church of Saint Martin contains three items that are registered as historical objects:

- A Statue: Sainte Fauste (15th century)
- A Group Sculpture: Virgin of Pity (15th century)
- A Bronze Bell (1611)

== See also ==
- Communes of the Corrèze department
