= Jean-Paul Dréau =

French composer and songwriter (1953–2026)

- Born: Jean-Paul Elie Benchetrit; 12 June 1953; Oran, French Algeria
- Died: 3 August 2026 (aged 73); Saint-Hilaire-Taurieux, France
- Occupations: Composer; Songwriter

Jean-Paul Dréau (12 June 1953 – 3 August 2026) was a French composer and songwriter.

Dréau wrote his first song, "Le Coup de soleil", in 1978, which was performed by Riccardo Cocciante, followed by Tout doucement, sung by Bibie.

Dréau died in Saint-Hilaire-Taurieux on 3 August 2026, at the age of 73.

== Discography ==
- Le Coup de soleil (1979)
- J’veux d’la tendresse (1980)
- Avec simplicité (1980)
- Au clair de tes silences (1980)
- Partie ce matin (1980)
- J’veux d’la tendresse (1981)
- Les caves de l’amour (1981)
- Je t’aime (1981)
- Tu es mon seul ami (1981)
- La Mélancolie (1981)
- Quand ça va mal (1982)
- Vieille (1982)
- Les choses de ma vie (1983)
- Les Filles de l’Angleterre (1984)
- Folle amoureuse (1984)
- Viens (1985)
- Cœur papier gris (1985)
- Partir (1985)
- Tout doucement (1985)
- Faut que j’t’oublie (1985)
- Sentimentalement fragile (1985)
- Amazone interdite (1985)
- Chanteuse de chansons d’amour (1985)
- Tell me why (1985)
- Pardonne (1985)
- C'est pas facile... (1986)
- À ma façon j’voudrais qu’on s’aime (1986)
- Le cœur en larmes (1986)
- J’veux pas l’savoir (1986)
- Devenir vieux (1988)
- Fragile (1988)
- Sentiments (1988)
- Si vous la voyez (1989)
- Elle est ma tendresse (1990)
- C’est pas facile à dire (1990)
- Pour Elle (1993)
- I’d Fly (1994)
- Sentiments Songes (1997)
- Les Nuits d'Isabelle (1997)
- Si tu pars (1997)
- J'veux d'la tendresse (1998)
- Les mots de trop (1999)
- I’d Fly (2000)
- On a tous besoin d'amour (2001)
- Je ne sais pas son nom (2004)
