= Auriac =

Auriac is the name or part of the name of several communes in France:

- Auriac, Aude, in the Aude department
- Auriac, Corrèze, in the Corrèze department
- Auriac, Pyrénées-Atlantiques, in the Pyrénées-Atlantiques department
- Auriac, former commune of the Var, now part of Brue-Auriac
- Auriac-du-Périgord, in the Dordogne department
- Auriac-Lagast, in the Aveyron department
- Auriac-l'Église, in the Cantal department
- Auriac-sur-Dropt, in the Lot-et-Garonne department
- Auriac-sur-Vendinelle, in the Haute-Garonne department
