= Albussac =

- Commune
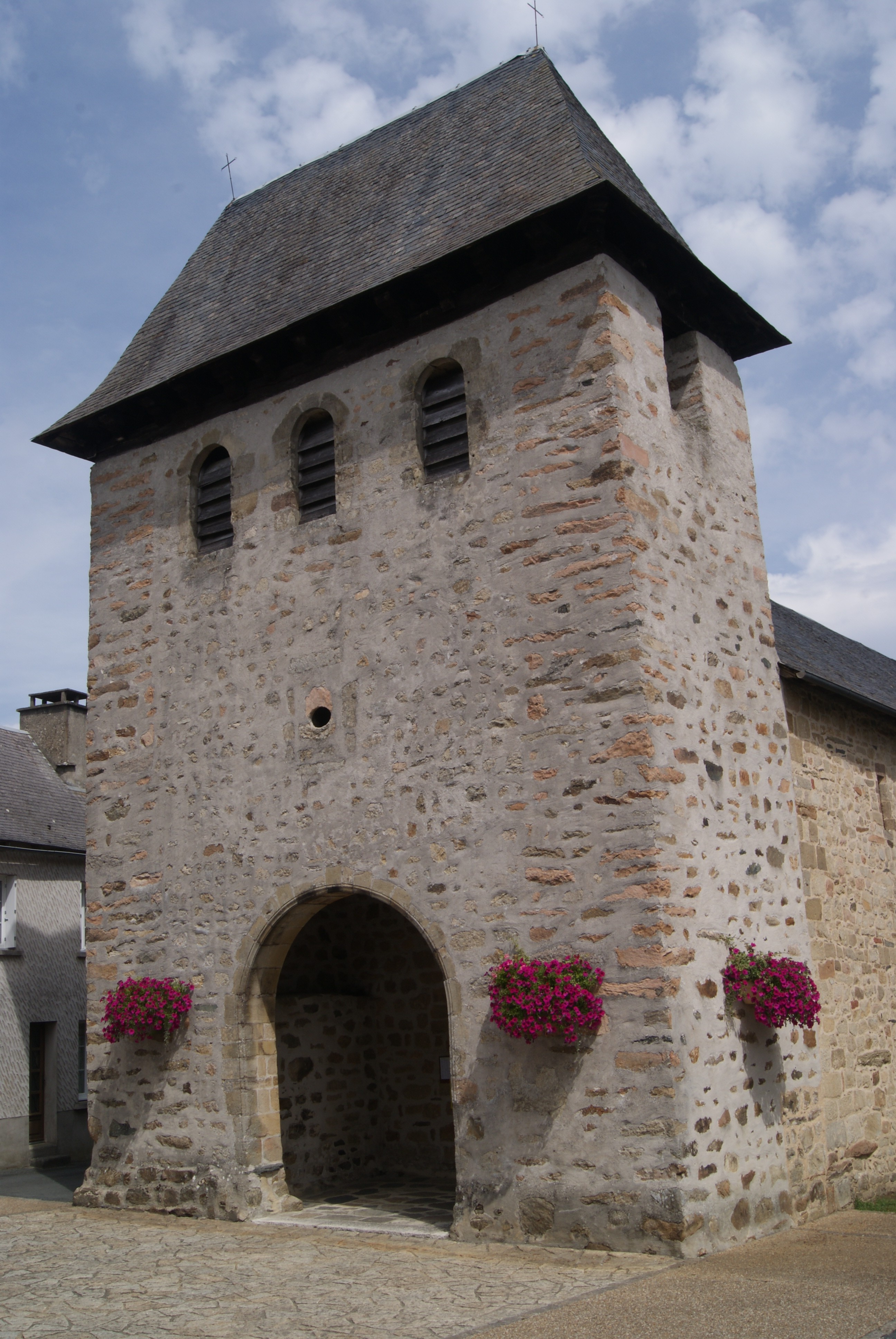
- The church in Albussac

- Coat of arms
- Location of Albussac
- Location within France Location within Nouvelle-Aquitaine
- Coordinates: 45°08′20″N 1°50′11″E
- Country: France
- Region: Nouvelle-Aquitaine
- Department: Corrèze
- Arrondissement: Tulle
- Canton: Argentat-sur-Dordogne
- Intercommunality: Xaintrie Val'Dordogne

Government
  - Mayor (2020–2026): Sébastien Meilhac
- Area^{1}: 36.26 km^{2} (14.00 sq mi)
- Elevation: 350 m (1,150 ft)
- Highest elevation: 637 m (2,090 ft)
- Lowest elevation: 240 m (790 ft)
- Population (2023): 725
  - Density: 20.0/km^{2} (51.8/sq mi)
- Time zone: UTC+01:00 (CET)
  - Summer (DST): UTC+02:00 (CEST)
- INSEE/Postal code: 19004 /19380
- ^{1} French Land Register data, which excludes lakes, ponds, glaciers > 1 km^{2} (0.386 sq mi or 247 acres) and river estuaries.

Albussac (French pronunciation: [albysak]; Occitan: Albuçac) is a commune in the Corrèze department in the Nouvelle-Aquitaine region of central France.

The commune has been awarded one flower by the National Council of Towns and Villages in Bloom in the Competition of cities and villages in Bloom.

== Geography ==
Albussac is located south-west of the Massif Central about 500m above sea level. It has an oceanic climate with temperatures ranging from 25 °C to 30 °C in summer and 9 °C in winter with periods of frequent cold waves in January and February (often −10 to −12 °C at sunrise and no more than 3 °C to 0 °C at 3pm). Albussac has regular snowfalls in winter with 20 cm of snow common.

The Roanne has its source in the commune.

Albussac is located some 100 km south-east of Limoges and 20 km east of Brive-la-Gaillarde. It can be accessed by the D921 road which comes from Beynat in the west and continues east through the commune and the village and continues to Saint-Chamant. There is also the D87 road branching off the D940 just south of Sainte-Fortunade and coming through the northern border of the commune and south-east to the village. There is a network of country roads in the commune and numerous hamlets and villages. These are:

- Aubiat
- Bedaine
- Chanterel
- Chastrusse
- Jassat
- La Commanderie
- La Salesse
- Lachaud
- Lafage
- Laumond
- Laverne
- Le Bros-Bas
- Le Bros-Haut
- Le Mas
- Les Quatre-Routes
- Madelbos
- Malmaury
- Prezat
- Roche-de-Vic
- Roussanne
- Teillol

The Ruisseau de la Font Blanc rises in the south of the commune which flows north gathering several tributaries and joining the Ruisseau de Rochette flowing from the west continuing north-east to join the Valeine at the edge of the commune. The Valeine also flows from the west north of the village gathering numerous tributaries in the commune and continuing to the east. There is also the Ruisseau de Mejeu forming part of the northern border flowing east to join the Souvigne. In the west an unnamed stream flows north-west forming the western border of the commune and joins the Ruisseau de la Grande.

=== Heraldry ===
Arms of Albussac	Blazon: Gules, a chevron of Or over a crescent Argent, in chief azure with three mullets of six points in Or.

== Demographics ==
The inhabitants of the commune are known as Albussacois or Albussacoises in French.

Historical population
Year	Pop.	±% p.a.
1968	851	—
1975	790	−1.06%
1982	718	−1.36%
1990	739	+0.36%
1999	668	−1.12%
2007	695	+0.50%
2012	691	−0.12%
2017	731	+1.13%
2023	725	−0.14%
Source: INSEE

== Law and government ==
=== Government ===
List of Successive Mayors of Albussac

From	To	Name	Party
1803	1806	Jean Chastrusse	
		Aymard Dancie	
		Gabriel-Noël Bourdet	
		Jean-Baptiste Bourdet	
1844	1862	Jean-Baptiste Chastrusse	
1873	1879	Jean-Baptiste Désiré Naudoux	
1879	1890	François Nugon	
1911		Jules Nugon	
2001	2016	Raymond Raoul	LR
2017	2026	Sébastien Meilhac	

== Sites and Monuments ==
- The Church of Saint Martin (12th century) is registered as an historical monument. The Church contains two items which are registered as historical objects:
  - A Cross: Christ on the Cross (Middle Ages)
  - A Bronze Bell (1625)
- The Murel Waterfall
- A Lime tree called "Sully" is more than 400 years old and one of the last in the Limousin region.
- Roche de Vic is a former Gallic oppidum that dominated the region.

== Notable people ==
- Yvon Bourdet, writer. He evoked Albussac in his book: In Praise of Patois or the Itinerary of an Occitan
- Emmanuel Berl, journalist and essayist, lived in the town during the Second World War at a place called La Malmaurie with his wife, the singer Mireille

== See also ==
- Communes of the Corrèze department
- Cantons of the Corrèze department
- Arrondissements of the Corrèze department

=== Bibliography ===
- Doctor Albert Massonie: Old Times in Albussac, Tulle, 1990 (in French)
