= Saint-Bonnet-Elvert =

- Commune
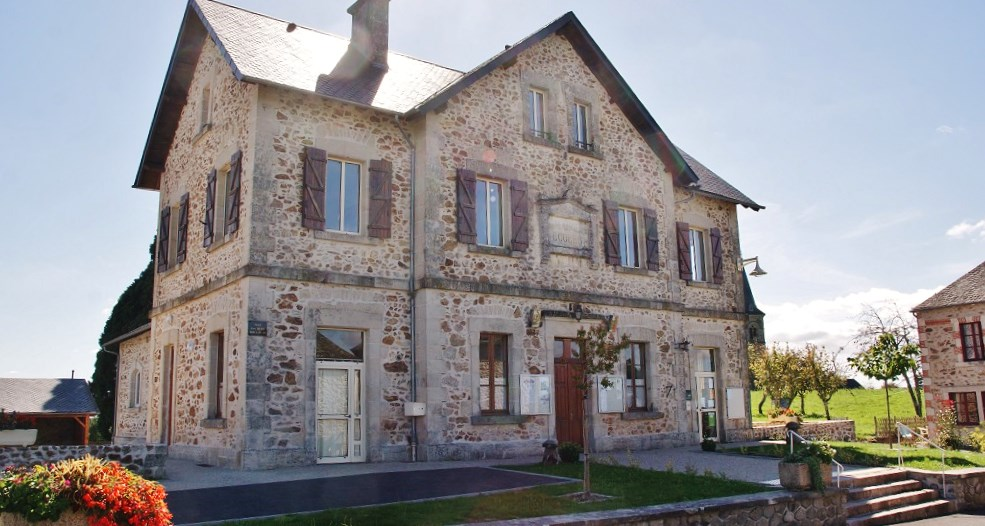

- Coat of arms
- Location of Saint-Bonnet-Elvert
- Location within France Location within Nouvelle-Aquitaine
- Coordinates: 45°09′46″N 1°54′16″E
- Country: France
- Region: Nouvelle-Aquitaine
- Department: Corrèze
- Arrondissement: Tulle
- Canton: Argentat-sur-Dordogne
- Intercommunality: Xaintrie Val'Dordogne

Government
  - Mayor (2020–2026): Antony Faurie
- Area^{1}: 18.37 km^{2} (7.09 sq mi)
- Elevation: 530 m (1,740 ft)
- Highest elevation: 560 m (1,840 ft)
- Lowest elevation: 227 m (745 ft)
- Population (2023): 234
  - Density: 12.7/km^{2} (33.0/sq mi)
- Time zone: UTC+01:00 (CET)
  - Summer (DST): UTC+02:00 (CEST)
- INSEE/Postal code: 19186 /19380
- ^{1} French Land Register data, which excludes lakes, ponds, glaciers > 1 km^{2} (0.386 sq mi or 247 acres) and river estuaries.

Saint-Bonnet-Elvert (French pronunciation: [sɛ̃ bɔnɛ ɛlvɛʁ]; Limousin: Sent Bonet el Vernh) is a commune in the Corrèze department in central France.

== Population ==
Historical population
Year	Pop.	±% p.a.
1968	341	—
1975	272	−3.18%
1982	230	−2.37%
1990	188	−2.49%
1999	166	−1.37%
2007	183	+1.23%
2012	206	+2.40%
2017	207	+0.10%
2023	234	+2.06%
Source: INSEE

== See also ==
- Communes of the Corrèze department
