= Camps-Saint-Mathurin-Léobazel =

- Commune
- Coat of arms
- Location of Camps-Saint-Mathurin-Léobazel
- Location within France Location within Nouvelle-Aquitaine
- Coordinates: 44°59′01″N 1°59′26″E
- Country: France
- Region: Nouvelle-Aquitaine
- Department: Corrèze
- Arrondissement: Tulle
- Canton: Argentat-sur-Dordogne

Government
  - Mayor (2020–2026): René Bitarelle
- Area^{1}: 34.08 km^{2} (13.16 sq mi)
- Elevation: 540 m (1,770 ft)
- Highest elevation: 623 m (2,044 ft)
- Lowest elevation: 160 m (520 ft)
- Population (2023): 206
  - Density: 6.04/km^{2} (15.7/sq mi)
- Time zone: UTC+01:00 (CET)
  - Summer (DST): UTC+02:00 (CEST)
- INSEE/Postal code: 19034 /19430
- ^{1} French Land Register data, which excludes lakes, ponds, glaciers > 1 km^{2} (0.386 sq mi or 247 acres) and river estuaries.

Camps-Saint-Mathurin-Léobazel is a commune in the Corrèze department in central France.

== Population ==
Historical population
Year	Pop.	±% p.a.
1968	457	—
1975	381	−2.56%
1982	341	−1.57%
1990	293	−1.88%
1999	243	−2.06%
2007	249	+0.31%
2012	241	−0.65%
2017	237	−0.33%
2023	206	−2.31%
Source: INSEE

== See also ==
- Communes of the Corrèze department
