= Roche de Vic =

Mountain in France

Highest point
- Elevation: 636 m (2,087 ft)
- Coordinates: 45°7′15″N 1°47′21″E

Geography
- Location within France Location within Europe
- Location: Corrèze departement, France
- Parent range: (Massif Central)

The Roche de Vic (or more rarely Puy de Roche de Vic) is a summit in the Massif Central, located in the commune of Albussac, in Corrèze.

The Roche de Vic reaches an altitude of 636 m, which makes it one of the main peaks of the Corrèze plateau that separates the Corrèze river valley to the northwest, from that of the Dordogne river valley, to the southeast. It has been a listed site since 1934.

The rock of Vic is renowned for its panoramic viewpoint, facilitated by the clearing of its rocky summit and by its isolation, more than 25 km west of the Xaintrie, the nearest higher group. The view opens up to the Monts du Cantal, Monts Dore, the Massif des Monédières, the Monts de Châlus, the Quercy, and the Périgord.

== History ==
Human occupation is attested on the site as early as the Neolithic. The Roche de Vic has benefited from numerous excavations and research since the 19th-century.

From 1880, the Roche de Vic housed a chapel, dedicated to the Virgin Mary, but was demolished in 1972 and replaced by a small oratory. A pilgrimage is held there every 15 August.

The site has been protected as a classified site since 1934. This protection concerns 36ha. An orientation table, inaugurated in 1964, is located on the high point.
