= Saint-Martial-Entraygues =

- Commune
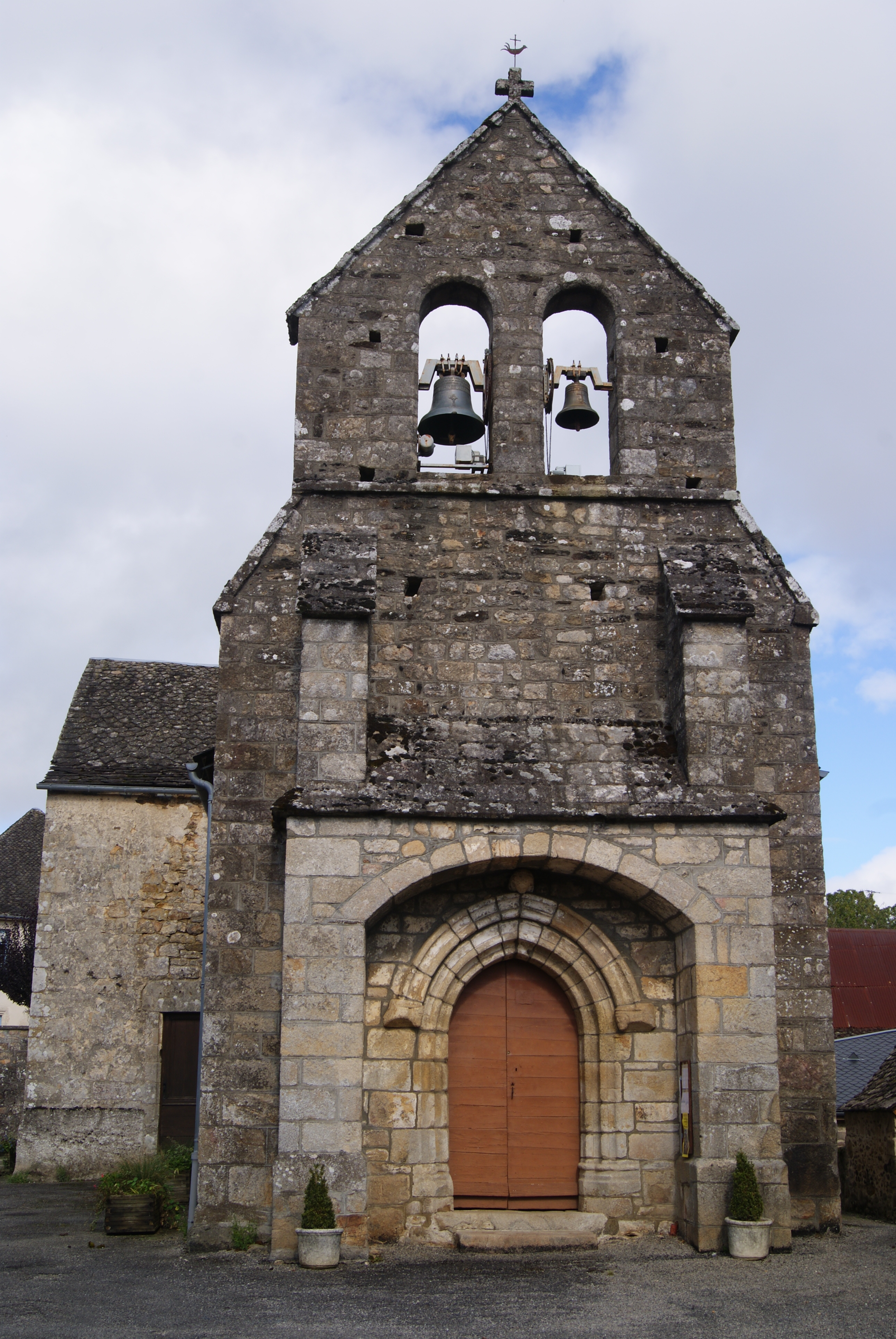
- The church of Saint-Martial

- Coat of arms
- Location of Saint-Martial-Entraygues
- Location within France Location within Nouvelle-Aquitaine
- Coordinates: 45°07′17″N 1°58′27″E
- Country: France
- Region: Nouvelle-Aquitaine
- Department: Corrèze
- Arrondissement: Tulle
- Canton: Argentat-sur-Dordogne
- Intercommunality: Xaintrie Val'Dordogne

Government
  - Mayor (2020–2026): Jean-Pierre Lechat
- Area^{1}: 7.39 km^{2} (2.85 sq mi)
- Elevation: 425 m (1,394 ft)
- Highest elevation: 508 m (1,667 ft)
- Lowest elevation: 186 m (610 ft)
- Population (2023): 106
  - Density: 14.3/km^{2} (37.2/sq mi)
- Time zone: UTC+01:00 (CET)
  - Summer (DST): UTC+02:00 (CEST)
- INSEE/Postal code: 19221 /19400
- ^{1} French Land Register data, which excludes lakes, ponds, glaciers > 1 km^{2} (0.386 sq mi or 247 acres) and river estuaries.

Saint-Martial-Entraygues (French pronunciation: [sɛ̃ maʁsjal ɑ̃tʁɛɡ]; Occitan: Sent Marçau d'Entre Aigas) is a commune in the Corrèze department in central France.

== Population ==
Historical population
Year	Pop.	±% p.a.
1968	94	—
1975	76	−2.99%
1982	103	+4.44%
1990	98	−0.62%
1999	87	−1.31%
2007	88	+0.14%
2012	74	−3.41%
2017	84	+2.57%
2023	106	+3.95%
Source: INSEE

== See also ==
- Communes of the Corrèze department
