= Canton of Argentat-sur-Dordogne =

Coordinates: 45°05′39″N 1°56′19″E

Argentat-sur-Dordogne
- Canton
- Interactive map of Argentat-sur-Dordogne
- Country: France
- Region: Nouvelle-Aquitaine
- Department: Corrèze
- No. of communes: {{{nbcomm}}}
- Area: 642.55 km^{2} (248.09 sq mi)
- Population (2023): 11,600
  - Density: 18.1/km^{2} (46.8/sq mi)
- INSEE code: 19 02

The canton of Argentat-sur-Dordogne (before March 2020: Argentat) is an administrative division situated in the Corrèze département and in the Nouvelle-Aquitaine region of France. Since the French canton reorganisation which came into effect in March 2015, the communes of the canton of Argentat are:

- Albussac
- Altillac
- Argentat-sur-Dordogne
- Auriac
- Bassignac-le-Bas
- Bassignac-le-Haut
- Camps-Saint-Mathurin-Léobazel
- La Chapelle-Saint-Géraud
- Darazac
- Forgès
- Goulles
- Hautefage
- Mercœur
- Monceaux-sur-Dordogne
- Neuville
- Reygade
- Rilhac-Xaintrie
- Saint-Bonnet-Elvert
- Saint-Bonnet-les-Tours-de-Merle
- Saint-Chamant
- Saint-Cirgues-la-Loutre
- Saint-Geniez-ô-Merle
- Saint-Hilaire-Taurieux
- Saint-Julien-aux-Bois
- Saint-Julien-le-Pèlerin
- Saint-Martial-Entraygues
- Saint-Privat
- Saint-Sylvain
- Servières-le-Château
- Sexcles

== Demographics ==
Historical population
Year	Pop.	±% p.a.
2013	12,190	—
2018	11,769	−0.70%
Source: INSEE

== See also ==
- Cantons of the Corrèze department
