= Bassignac-le-Haut =

- Commune
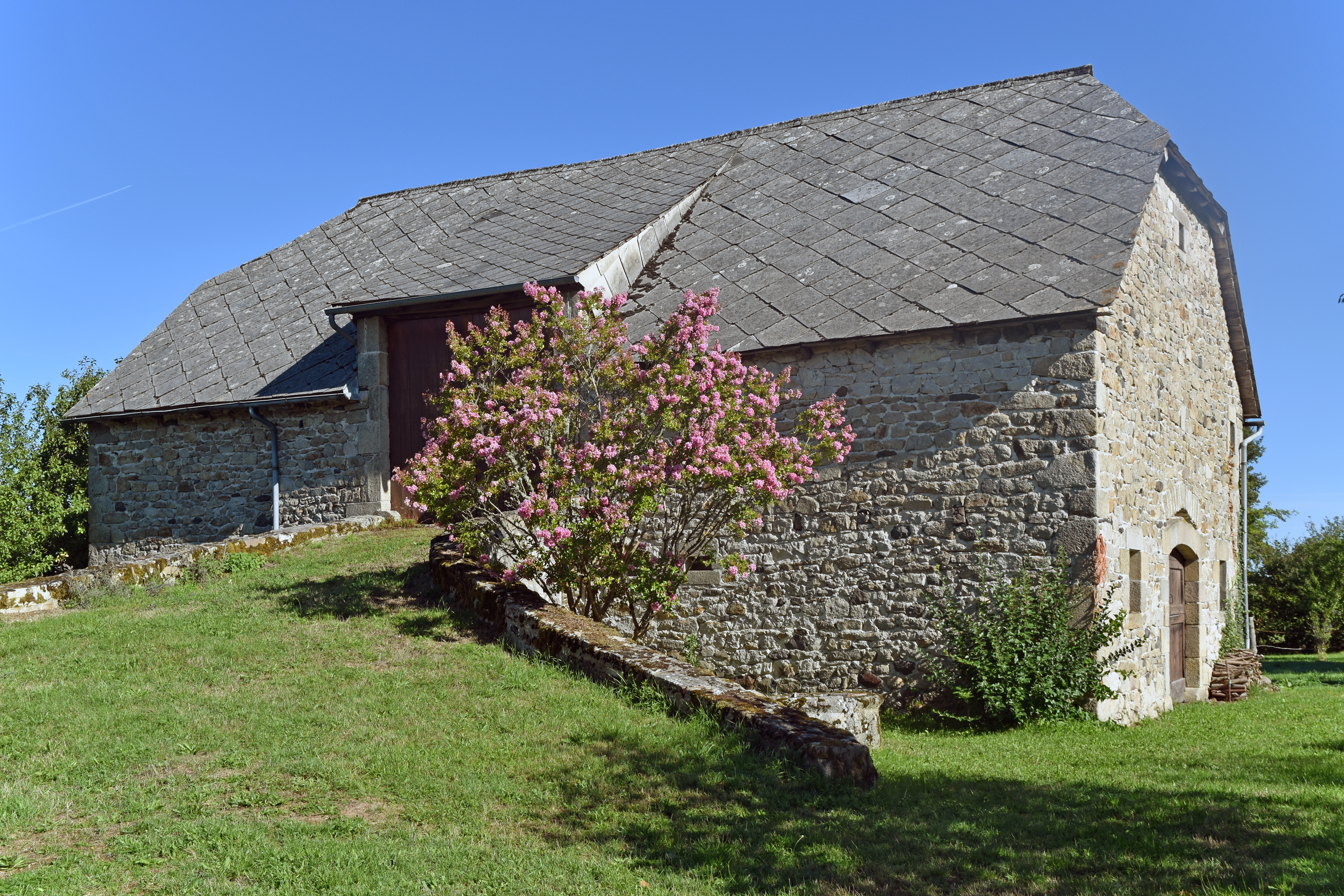
- An old barn in Bassignac-le-Haut

- Coat of arms
- Location of Bassignac-le-Haut
- Location within France Location within Nouvelle-Aquitaine
- Coordinates: 45°12′44″N 2°04′21″E
- Country: France
- Region: Nouvelle-Aquitaine
- Department: Corrèze
- Arrondissement: Tulle
- Canton: Argentat-sur-Dordogne

Government
  - Mayor (2020–2026): Jean Claude Turquet
- Area^{1}: 18.37 km^{2} (7.09 sq mi)
- Elevation: 540 m (1,770 ft)
- Highest elevation: 628 m (2,060 ft)
- Lowest elevation: 253 m (830 ft)
- Population (2023): 160
  - Density: 8.7/km^{2} (23/sq mi)
- Time zone: UTC+01:00 (CET)
  - Summer (DST): UTC+02:00 (CEST)
- INSEE/Postal code: 19018 /19220
- ^{1} French Land Register data, which excludes lakes, ponds, glaciers > 1 km^{2} (0.386 sq mi or 247 acres) and river estuaries.

Bassignac-le-Haut (French pronunciation: [basiɲak lə o]; Occitan: Bassinhac de Dessus) is a commune in the Corrèze department in the Nouvelle-Aquitaine region of central France.

== History ==
Bassignac-le-Haut appears as Baßignac le Haut on the 1750 Cassini Map and as Bassignac le Haut on the 1790 version.

=== Heraldry ===
| Arms of Bassignac-le-Haut | The official status of the blazon remains to be determined. Blazon: Party per pale, at 1 Argent a bend Gules between 6 saltires Gules couped 2 and 1 at 1 and in bend at 2; at 2Gules a bend of Or, in chief Azure charged with 3 mullets of Or. |

== Geography ==
Bassignac-le-Haut is located in the Massif Central some 20 km north-east of Argentat and 20 km south-east of Tulle. Access to the commune is by the D13 road from Darazac in the south which passes through the commune and the village before continuing north-east along the banks of the river then across to Saint-Merd-de-Lapleau. Apart from the village there are the hamlets of Le Bousquet, Vaujour, Le Mas, Vernac, Maurel, and Ymons in the commune. The commune is mostly farmland but heavily forested along the river.

A lake formed by the Barrage du Chastang dam on the Dordogne river forms the western and northern border of the commune. The Ruisseau de vaujour rises in the north-west of the commune and flows the short distance north-west to the Dordogne. Similarly the Ruisseau du Roc Chabrier rises in the north and flows north into the Dordogne. The Ruisseau de la Cascade flows north through the eastern part of the commune to join the Dordogne east of the commune. The Ruisseau de Vieilzot rises just south of the commune and forms much of the southern border as it floes west to join the Dordogne in the south-western tip of the commune.

== Demography ==
The inhabitants of the commune are known as Bassignacois or Bassignacoises in French.

Historical population

| Year | Pop. | ±% p.a. |
|---|---|---|
| 1793 | 761 | — |
| 1821 | 795 | +0.16% |
| 1846 | 822 | +0.13% |
| 1872 | 802 | −0.09% |
| 1901 | 667 | −0.63% |
| 1926 | 548 | −0.78% |
| 1946 | 518 | −0.28% |
| 1962 | 429 | −1.17% |
| 1968 | 476 | +1.75% |

| Year | Pop. | ±% p.a. |
|---|---|---|
| 1975 | 426 | −1.57% |
| 1982 | 395 | −1.07% |
| 1990 | 311 | −2.94% |
| 1999 | 212 | −4.17% |
| 2007 | 178 | −2.16% |
| 2012 | 204 | +2.76% |
| 2017 | 179 | −2.58% |
| 2023 | 160 | −1.85% |

Source: EHESS and INSEE

== Local government ==
List of Successive Mayors

| From | To | Name |
|---|---|---|
| 2001 | 2007 | Raymond Delmas |
| 2007 | 2008 | Hubert Lavesque |
| 2008 | 2011 | Josette Puyraymond |
| 2012 | 2026 | Jean Claude Turquet |

== Culture and heritage ==
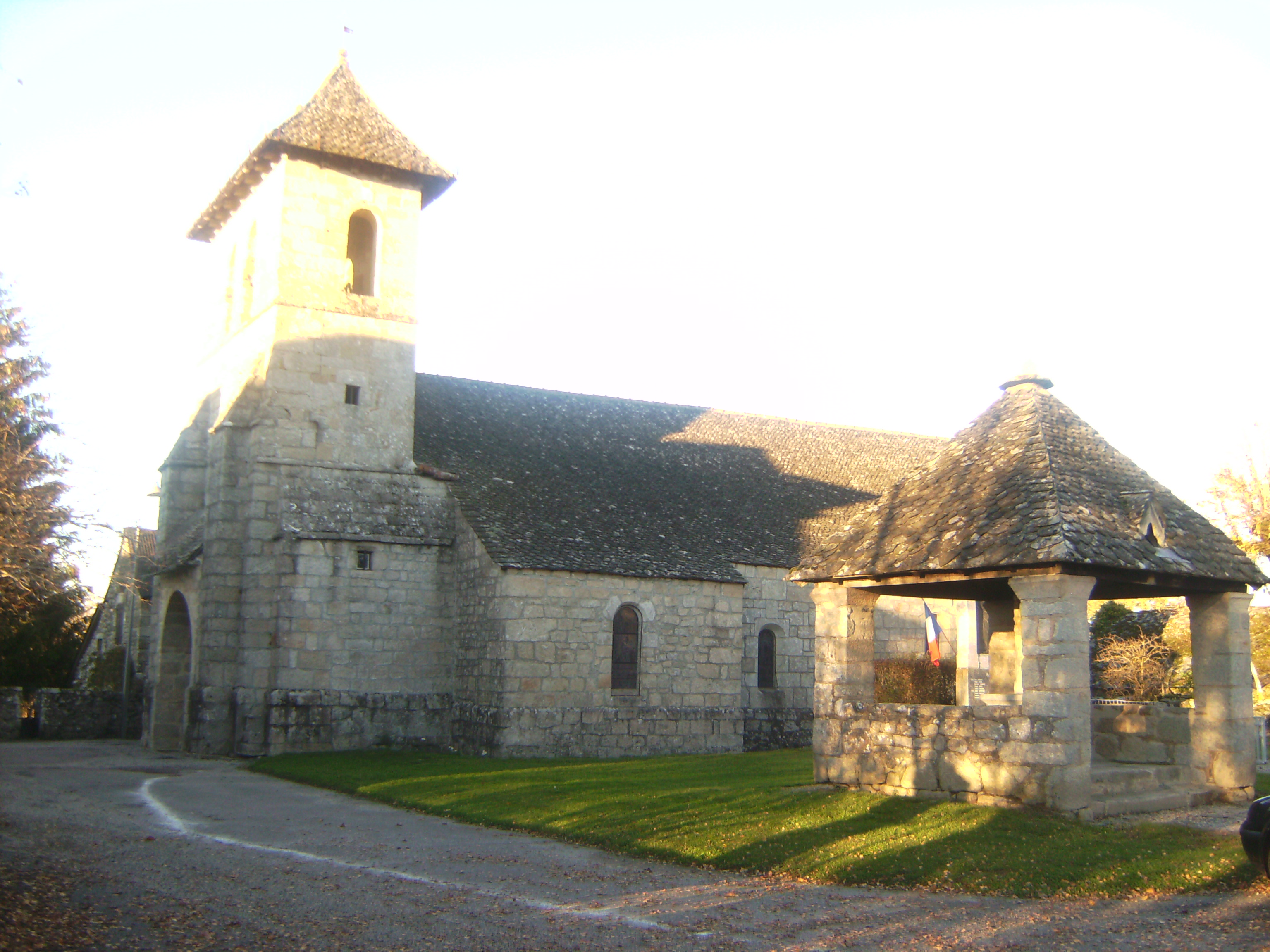
The Church of Saint-Pierre-ès-Liens

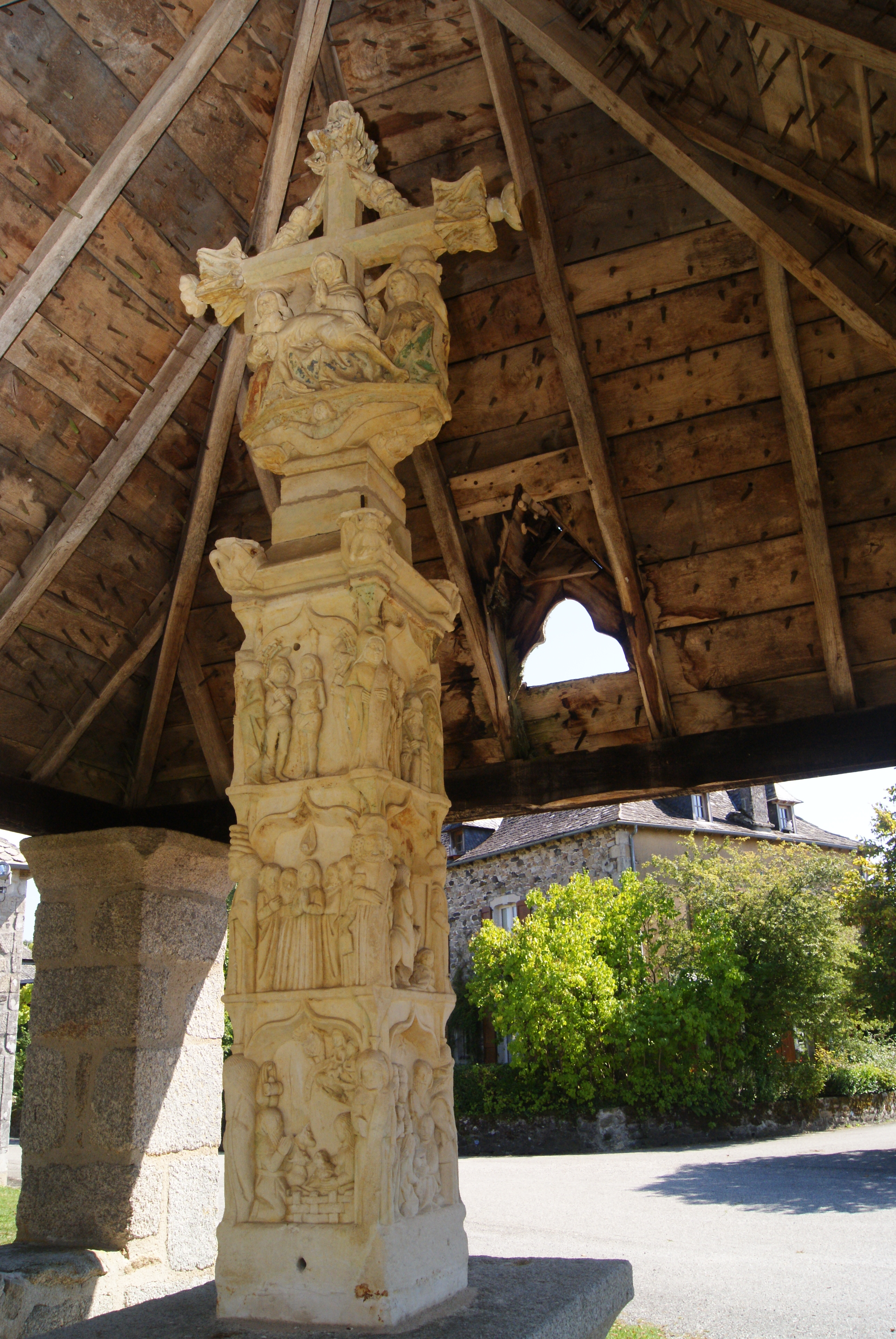
The Covered Cross

=== Religious heritage ===
The commune has several religious buildings and sites that are registered as historical monuments:

- The Ouradour Cemetery Cross (Middle Ages)
- The Ciriex Cemetery Cross (12th century)
- A Covered Cross in the old cemetery (15th century)
- The Church of Saint-Pierre-ès-Liens (16th century) The Church contains several items that are registered as historical objects:
  - A Painting with frame: Saint Roch (18th century)
  - A Painting with frame: John the Baptist (18th century)
  - An Altar Painting with frame: Christ on the Cross (18th century)
  - A Painting with frame: Presentation of the Rosary to Saints Dominic and Catherine (18th century)

== Notable people ==
- Stephen of Obazine (1085-1154), priest and hermit famed for his pious nature. Born in the commune.

== See also ==
- Communes of the Corrèze department
