= Neuville, Corrèze =

Neuville
- Commune
- Coat of arms
- Location of Neuville
- Location within France Location within Nouvelle-Aquitaine
- Coordinates: 45°06′44″N 1°49′52″E
- Country: France
- Region: Nouvelle-Aquitaine
- Department: Corrèze
- Arrondissement: Tulle
- Canton: Argentat-sur-Dordogne
- Intercommunality: Xaintrie Val'Dordogne

Government
  - Mayor (2024–2026): Eliane Laffaire
- Area^{1}: 14.29 km^{2} (5.52 sq mi)
- Elevation: 515 m (1,690 ft)
- Highest elevation: 593 m (1,946 ft)
- Lowest elevation: 238 m (781 ft)
- Population (2023): 201
  - Density: 14.1/km^{2} (36.4/sq mi)
- Time zone: UTC+01:00 (CET)
  - Summer (DST): UTC+02:00 (CEST)
- INSEE/Postal code: 19149 /19380
- ^{1} French Land Register data, which excludes lakes, ponds, glaciers > 1 km^{2} (0.386 sq mi or 247 acres) and river estuaries.

Neuville (French pronunciation: [nøvil]; Occitan: Neuvila) is a commune in the Corrèze department in central France.

== Population ==
Historical population
| Year | Pop. | ±% p.a. |
|---|---|---|
| 1968 | 310 | — |
| 1975 | 250 | −3.03% |
| 1982 | 237 | −0.76% |
| 1990 | 216 | −1.15% |
| 1999 | 187 | −1.59% |
| 2007 | 196 | +0.59% |
| 2012 | 207 | +1.10% |
| 2017 | 189 | −1.80% |
| 2023 | 201 | +1.03% |
Source: INSEE

== See also ==
- Communes of the Corrèze department
