= Saint-Julien-le-Pèlerin =

- Commune
- Coat of arms
- Location of Saint-Julien-le-Pèlerin
- Location within France Location within Nouvelle-Aquitaine
- Coordinates: 45°01′07″N 2°04′40″E
- Country: France
- Region: Nouvelle-Aquitaine
- Department: Corrèze
- Arrondissement: Tulle
- Canton: Argentat-sur-Dordogne

Government
  - Mayor (2020–2026): Jean-François Gasquet
- Area^{1}: 15.4 km^{2} (5.9 sq mi)
- Elevation: 600 m (2,000 ft)
- Highest elevation: 624 m (2,047 ft)
- Lowest elevation: 316 m (1,037 ft)
- Population (2023): 115
  - Density: 7.47/km^{2} (19.3/sq mi)
- Time zone: UTC+01:00 (CET)
  - Summer (DST): UTC+02:00 (CEST)
- INSEE/Postal code: 19215 /19430
- ^{1} French Land Register data, which excludes lakes, ponds, glaciers > 1 km^{2} (0.386 sq mi or 247 acres) and river estuaries.

Saint-Julien-le-Pèlerin (French pronunciation: [sɛ̃ ʒyljɛ̃ lə pɛlʁɛ̃]; Limousin: Sent Julian lo Peregrin) is a commune in the Corrèze department in central France.

== Population ==
Historical population
Year	Pop.	±% p.a.
1968	256	—
1975	209	−2.86%
1982	197	−0.84%
1990	168	−1.97%
1999	133	−2.56%
2007	141	+0.73%
2012	130	−1.61%
2017	129	−0.15%
2023	115	−1.90%
Source: INSEE

== See also ==
- Communes of the Corrèze department
