= Forgès =

- Commune
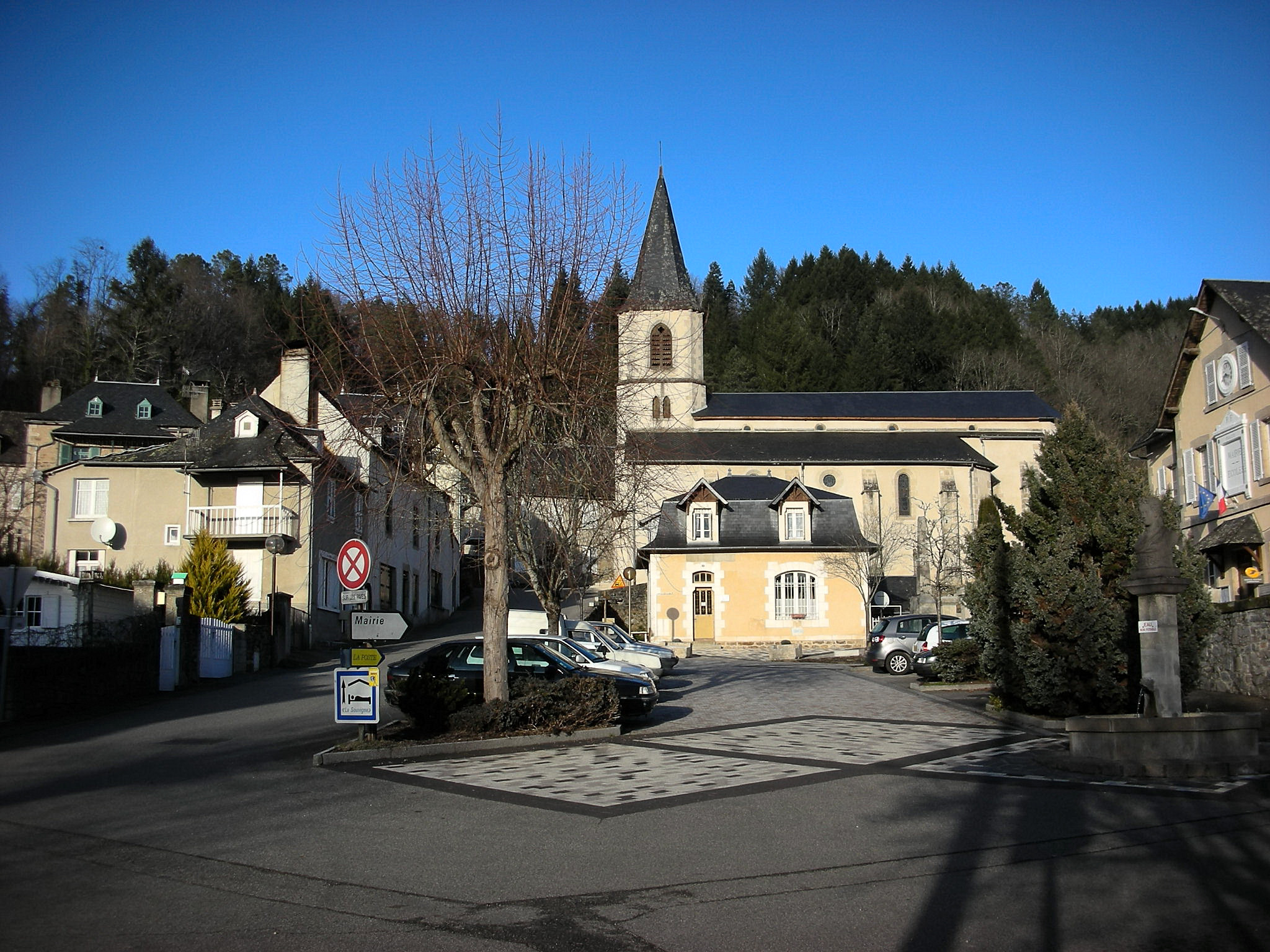
- The church and square in Forgès

- Coat of arms
- Location of Forgès
- Location within France Location within Nouvelle-Aquitaine
- Coordinates: 45°09′23″N 1°52′15″E
- Country: France
- Region: Nouvelle-Aquitaine
- Department: Corrèze
- Arrondissement: Tulle
- Canton: Argentat-sur-Dordogne

Government
  - Mayor (2020–2026): Christiane Cure
- Area^{1}: 10.43 km^{2} (4.03 sq mi)
- Elevation: 228 m (748 ft)
- Highest elevation: 455 m (1,493 ft)
- Lowest elevation: 207 m (679 ft)
- Population (2023): 263
  - Density: 25.2/km^{2} (65.3/sq mi)
- Time zone: UTC+01:00 (CET)
  - Summer (DST): UTC+02:00 (CEST)
- INSEE/Postal code: 19084 /19380
- ^{1} French Land Register data, which excludes lakes, ponds, glaciers > 1 km^{2} (0.386 sq mi or 247 acres) and river estuaries.

Forgès is a commune in the Corrèze department in central France.

== Population ==
Historical population
Year	Pop.	±% p.a.
1968	461	—
1975	375	−2.91%
1982	356	−0.74%
1990	344	−0.43%
1999	319	−0.83%
2007	316	−0.12%
2012	317	+0.06%
2017	286	−2.04%
2023	263	−1.39%
Source: INSEE

== See also ==
- Communes of the Corrèze department
