= Saint-Sylvain, Corrèze =

Saint-Sylvain
- Commune
- Coat of arms
- Location of Saint-Sylvain
- Location within France Location within Nouvelle-Aquitaine
- Coordinates: 45°10′34″N 1°52′36″E
- Country: France
- Region: Nouvelle-Aquitaine
- Department: Corrèze
- Arrondissement: Tulle
- Canton: Argentat-sur-Dordogne

Government
  - Mayor (2020–2026): Stéphane Ludier
- Area^{1}: 7.49 km^{2} (2.89 sq mi)
- Elevation: 250 m (820 ft)
- Highest elevation: 546 m (1,791 ft)
- Lowest elevation: 236 m (774 ft)
- Population (2023): 131
  - Density: 17.5/km^{2} (45.3/sq mi)
- Time zone: UTC+01:00 (CET)
  - Summer (DST): UTC+02:00 (CEST)
- INSEE/Postal code: 19245 /19380
- ^{1} French Land Register data, which excludes lakes, ponds, glaciers > 1 km^{2} (0.386 sq mi or 247 acres) and river estuaries.

Saint-Sylvain (French pronunciation: [sɛ̃ silvɛ̃]; Limousin: Sent Silvan) is a commune in the Corrèze department in central France.

== Population ==
Historical population
Year	Pop.	±% p.a.
1968	163	—
1975	131	−3.07%
1982	135	+0.43%
1990	139	+0.37%
1999	139	+0.00%
2007	145	+0.53%
2012	142	−0.42%
2017	135	−1.01%
2023	131	−0.50%
Source: INSEE

== See also ==
- Communes of the Corrèze department
