= Reygade =

- Commune
- Coat of arms
- Location of Reygade
- Location within France Location within Nouvelle-Aquitaine
- Coordinates: 45°00′57″N 1°54′36″E
- Country: France
- Region: Nouvelle-Aquitaine
- Department: Corrèze
- Arrondissement: Tulle
- Canton: Argentat-sur-Dordogne

Government
  - Mayor (2020–2026): Bernard Trassoudaine
- Area^{1}: 13.94 km^{2} (5.38 sq mi)
- Elevation: 450 m (1,480 ft)
- Highest elevation: 526 m (1,726 ft)
- Lowest elevation: 160 m (520 ft)
- Population (2023): 175
  - Density: 12.6/km^{2} (32.5/sq mi)
- Time zone: UTC+01:00 (CET)
  - Summer (DST): UTC+02:00 (CEST)
- INSEE/Postal code: 19171 /19430
- ^{1} French Land Register data, which excludes lakes, ponds, glaciers > 1 km^{2} (0.386 sq mi or 247 acres) and river estuaries.

Reygade (French pronunciation: [ʁɛɡad]; Occitan: Raigadas) is a commune in the Corrèze department in central France.

== Population ==
Historical population
Year	Pop.	±% p.a.
1968	226	—
1975	210	−1.04%
1982	202	−0.55%
1990	172	−1.99%
1999	161	−0.73%
2007	185	+1.75%
2012	197	+1.26%
2017	189	−0.83%
2023	175	−1.27%
Source: INSEE

== Local culture and heritage ==
=== Places and monuments ===
==== Église Saint-Eutrope-de-Saintes de Reygade ====
It is romanesque church the has been updated in 18th century.

==== Chapel ====
In a small chapel near the cemetery, behind a protective glass window, you can admire a polychrome burial of Jesus of the fifteenth century with a sound and light show commented by Jean Piat.

Neither the author nor the exact date of this masterpiece is known, but the entombment at Carennac (in the Lot) is very similar to it but in a non-polychrome form. It is impressive for the painful expression of the life-size figures, at the centre of which is the weeping Virgin Mary, supported by John the Evangelist and Mary, wife of Cleophas. On each side Salome clasps her hands and Mary Magdalene holds a vase of spices. Jesus, whose face is imbued with gentleness, is stretched out on a stone table. The shroud is supported by Joseph of Arimathea, on the right, and Nicodemus, on the left.

== See also ==
- Communes of the Corrèze department
