= Saint-Julien-aux-Bois =

- Commune
- Coat of arms
- Location of Saint-Julien-aux-Bois
- Location within France Location within Nouvelle-Aquitaine
- Coordinates: 45°07′51″N 2°08′23″E
- Country: France
- Region: Nouvelle-Aquitaine
- Department: Corrèze
- Arrondissement: Tulle
- Canton: Argentat-sur-Dordogne

Government
  - Mayor (2020–2026): Martine Lavergne
- Area^{1}: 44.09 km^{2} (17.02 sq mi)
- Elevation: 580 m (1,900 ft)
- Highest elevation: 664 m (2,178 ft)
- Lowest elevation: 354 m (1,161 ft)
- Population (2023): 430
  - Density: 9.8/km^{2} (25/sq mi)
- Time zone: UTC+01:00 (CET)
  - Summer (DST): UTC+02:00 (CEST)
- INSEE/Postal code: 19214 /19220
- ^{1} French Land Register data, which excludes lakes, ponds, glaciers > 1 km^{2} (0.386 sq mi or 247 acres) and river estuaries.

Saint-Julien-aux-Bois (French pronunciation: [sɛ̃ ʒyljɛ̃ o bwa]; Limousin: Sent Julian al Bois) is a commune in the Corrèze department in central France.

== Geography ==
The Maronne river forms the commune's southern boundary.

== Population ==
Historical population
Year	Pop.	±% p.a.
1968	764	—
1975	697	−1.30%
1982	627	−1.50%
1990	584	−0.88%
1999	501	−1.69%
2007	475	−0.66%
2012	498	+0.95%
2017	466	−1.32%
2023	430	−1.33%
Source: INSEE

== See also ==
- Communes of the Corrèze department
