= Rilhac-Xaintrie =

- Commune
- Coat of arms
- Location of Rilhac-Xaintrie
- Location within France Location within Nouvelle-Aquitaine
- Coordinates: 45°10′04″N 2°11′53″E
- Country: France
- Region: Nouvelle-Aquitaine
- Department: Corrèze
- Arrondissement: Tulle
- Canton: Argentat-sur-Dordogne

Government
  - Mayor (2020–2026): Laurence Dumas
- Area^{1}: 25.31 km^{2} (9.77 sq mi)
- Elevation: 639 m (2,096 ft)
- Highest elevation: 653 m (2,142 ft)
- Lowest elevation: 264 m (866 ft)
- Population (2023): 303
  - Density: 12.0/km^{2} (31.0/sq mi)
- Time zone: UTC+01:00 (CET)
  - Summer (DST): UTC+02:00 (CEST)
- INSEE/Postal code: 19173 /19220
- ^{1} French Land Register data, which excludes lakes, ponds, glaciers > 1 km^{2} (0.386 sq mi or 247 acres) and river estuaries.

Rilhac-Xaintrie is a commune in the Corrèze department and Nouvelle-Aquitaine region of central France.

== Population ==
Historical population
Year	Pop.	±% p.a.
1968	537	—
1975	509	−0.76%
1982	439	−2.09%
1990	383	−1.69%
1999	330	−1.64%
2007	308	−0.86%
2012	323	+0.96%
2017	300	−1.47%
2023	303	+0.17%
Source: INSEE

== Etymology ==
The town first appears in charters in the eleventh century, as Rialiaco.

== Sights ==
The castle, dating from the fifteenth and sixteenth centuries, is a historical site; however, the nineteenth-century building which adjoins it is not protected.

== See also ==
- Communes of the Corrèze department
