= Darazac =

- Commune
- Coat of arms
- Location of Darazac
- Location within France Location within Nouvelle-Aquitaine
- Coordinates: 45°10′34″N 2°05′07″E
- Country: France
- Region: Nouvelle-Aquitaine
- Department: Corrèze
- Arrondissement: Tulle
- Canton: Argentat-sur-Dordogne

Government
  - Mayor (2020–2026): Joël Beynel
- Area^{1}: 14.55 km^{2} (5.62 sq mi)
- Elevation: 557 m (1,827 ft)
- Highest elevation: 623 m (2,044 ft)
- Lowest elevation: 391 m (1,283 ft)
- Population (2023): 154
  - Density: 10.6/km^{2} (27.4/sq mi)
- Time zone: UTC+01:00 (CET)
  - Summer (DST): UTC+02:00 (CEST)
- INSEE/Postal code: 19069 /19220
- ^{1} French Land Register data, which excludes lakes, ponds, glaciers > 1 km^{2} (0.386 sq mi or 247 acres) and river estuaries.

Darazac (French pronunciation: [daʁazak]; Occitan: Darasac) is a commune in the Corrèze department in central France.

== Population ==
Historical population
Year	Pop.	±% p.a.
1968	270	—
1975	246	−1.32%
1982	182	−4.21%
1990	149	−2.47%
1999	139	−0.77%
2007	158	+1.61%
2012	151	−0.90%
2017	138	−1.78%
2023	154	+1.85%
Source: INSEE

== See also ==
- Communes of the Corrèze department
