= La Chapelle-Saint-Géraud =

- Commune
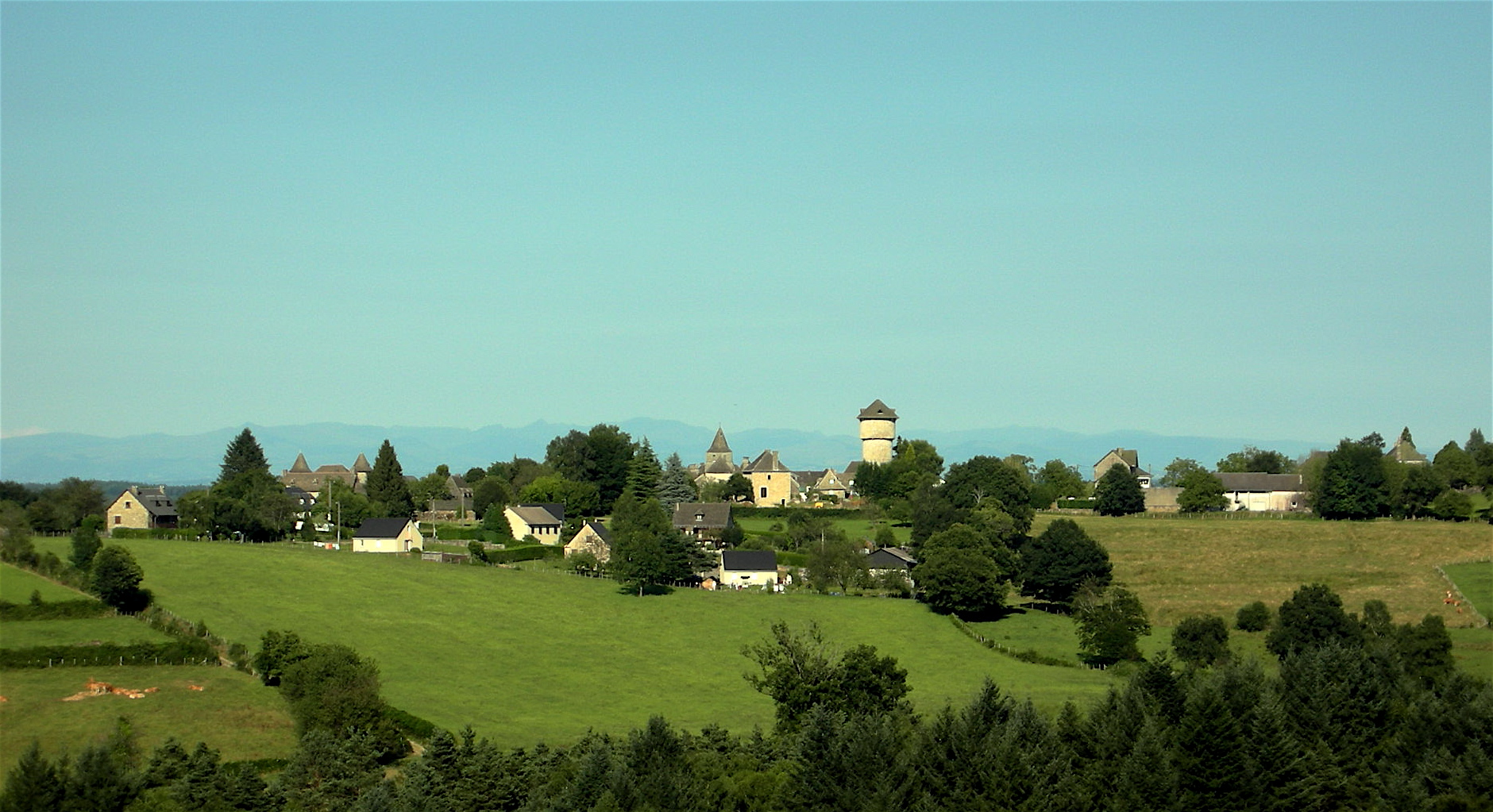
- A general view of La Chapelle-Saint-Géraud

- Coat of arms
- Location of La Chapelle-Saint-Géraud
- Location within France Location within Nouvelle-Aquitaine
- Coordinates: 45°02′25″N 1°57′17″E
- Country: France
- Region: Nouvelle-Aquitaine
- Department: Corrèze
- Arrondissement: Tulle
- Canton: Argentat-sur-Dordogne

Government
  - Mayor (2020–2026): Marie Claude Carlat
- Area^{1}: 17.59 km^{2} (6.79 sq mi)
- Elevation: 540 m (1,770 ft)
- Highest elevation: 562 m (1,844 ft)
- Lowest elevation: 180 m (590 ft)
- Population (2023): 196
  - Density: 11.1/km^{2} (28.9/sq mi)
- Time zone: UTC+01:00 (CET)
  - Summer (DST): UTC+02:00 (CEST)
- INSEE/Postal code: 19045 /19430
- ^{1} French Land Register data, which excludes lakes, ponds, glaciers > 1 km^{2} (0.386 sq mi or 247 acres) and river estuaries.

La Chapelle-Saint-Géraud (French pronunciation: [la ʃapɛl sɛ̃ ʒeʁo]; Occitan: La Chapèla Sent Geraud) is a commune in the Corrèze department in central France.

== Population ==
Historical population
Year	Pop.	±% p.a.
1968	307	—
1975	276	−1.51%
1982	249	−1.46%
1990	219	−1.59%
1999	225	+0.30%
2007	216	−0.51%
2012	246	+2.64%
2017	198	−4.25%
2023	196	−0.17%
Source: INSEE

== Geography ==
The Maronne river forms the commune's northeastern boundary.

== See also ==
- Communes of the Corrèze department
