= Saint-Chamant, Corrèze =

Saint-Chamant
- Commune
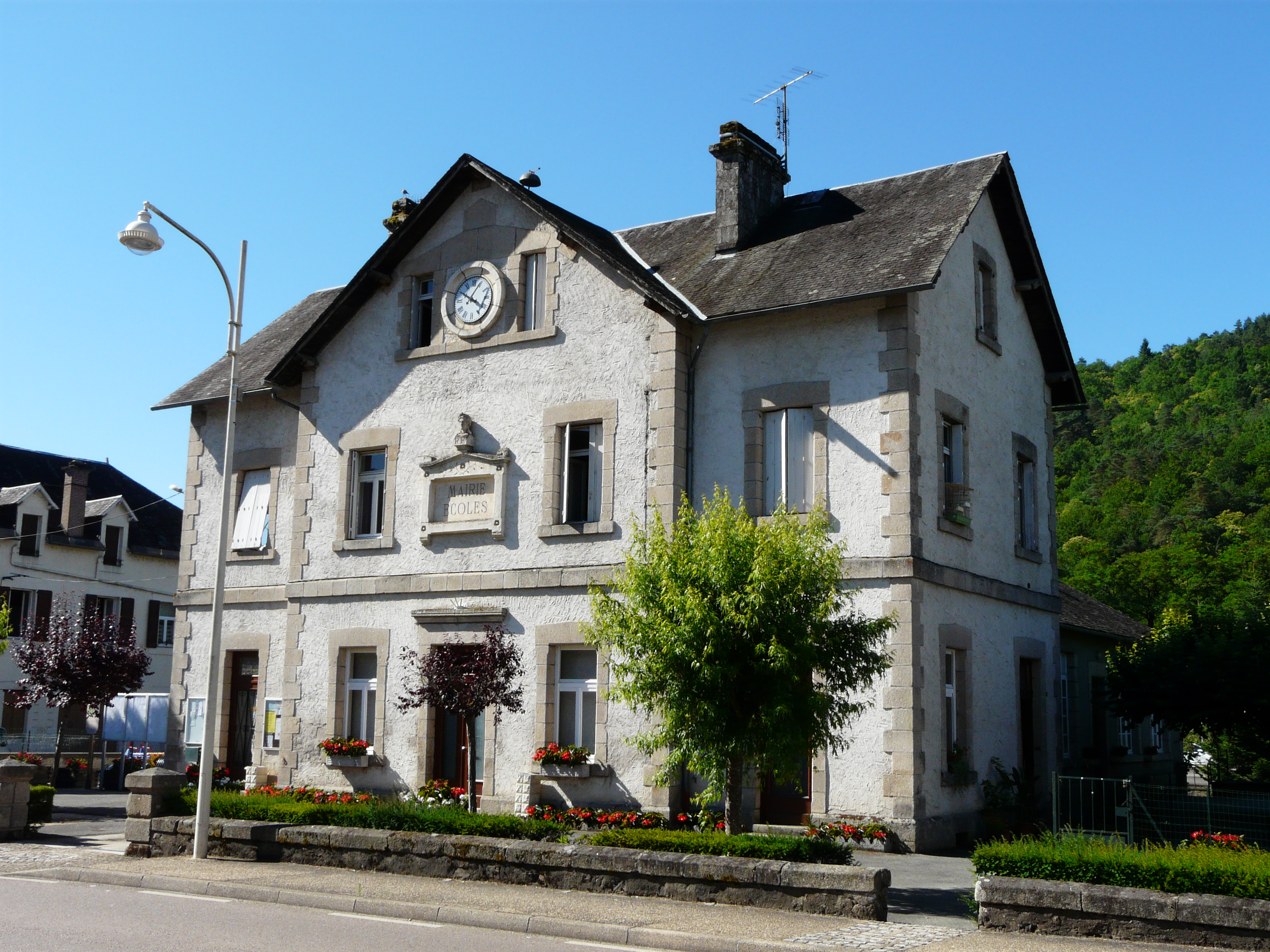
- Town hall

- Coat of arms
- Location of Saint-Chamant
- Location within France Location within Nouvelle-Aquitaine
- Coordinates: 45°07′37″N 1°53′47″E
- Country: France
- Region: Nouvelle-Aquitaine
- Department: Corrèze
- Arrondissement: Tulle
- Canton: Argentat-sur-Dordogne

Government
  - Mayor (2020–2026): Clément Coudert
- Area^{1}: 14.05 km^{2} (5.42 sq mi)
- Elevation: 200 m (660 ft)
- Highest elevation: 487 m (1,598 ft)
- Lowest elevation: 180 m (590 ft)
- Population (2023): 468
  - Density: 33.3/km^{2} (86.3/sq mi)
- Time zone: UTC+01:00 (CET)
  - Summer (DST): UTC+02:00 (CEST)
- INSEE/Postal code: 19192 /19380
- ^{1} French Land Register data, which excludes lakes, ponds, glaciers > 1 km^{2} (0.386 sq mi or 247 acres) and river estuaries.

Saint-Chamant (French pronunciation: [sɛ̃ ʃamɑ̃]; Limousin: Sench Amand) is a commune in the Corrèze department in central France.

== Population ==
Historical population
Year	Pop.	±% p.a.
1968	665	—
1975	617	−1.06%
1982	560	−1.38%
1990	513	−1.09%
1999	511	−0.04%
2007	511	+0.00%
2012	491	−0.80%
2017	486	−0.20%
2023	468	−0.63%
Source: INSEE

== See also ==
- Communes of the Corrèze department
