= Saint-Hilaire-Taurieux =

- Commune
- Coat of arms
- Location of Saint-Hilaire-Taurieux
- Location within France Location within Nouvelle-Aquitaine
- Coordinates: 45°05′06″N 1°49′58″E
- Country: France
- Region: Nouvelle-Aquitaine
- Department: Corrèze
- Arrondissement: Tulle
- Canton: Argentat-sur-Dordogne

Government
  - Mayor (2020–2026): Laurent Longour
- Area^{1}: 8.61 km^{2} (3.32 sq mi)
- Elevation: 425 m (1,394 ft)
- Highest elevation: 553 m (1,814 ft)
- Lowest elevation: 231 m (758 ft)
- Population (2023): 91
  - Density: 11/km^{2} (27/sq mi)
- Time zone: UTC+01:00 (CET)
  - Summer (DST): UTC+02:00 (CEST)
- INSEE/Postal code: 19212 /19400
- ^{1} French Land Register data, which excludes lakes, ponds, glaciers > 1 km^{2} (0.386 sq mi or 247 acres) and river estuaries.

Saint-Hilaire-Taurieux (French pronunciation: [sɛ̃.t‿ilɛʁ toʁjø]; Occitan: Sent Alari de Taurion) is a commune in the Corrèze department in central France.

== Population ==
Historical population
Year	Pop.	±% p.a.
1968	173	—
1975	139	−3.08%
1982	116	−2.55%
1990	103	−1.47%
1999	86	−1.98%
2007	97	+1.52%
2012	92	−1.05%
2017	103	+2.28%
2023	91	−2.04%
Source: INSEE

== See also ==
- Communes of the Corrèze department
