= Servières-le-Château =

Servières-le-Château Serviera dau Chasteu (Occitan)
- Commune
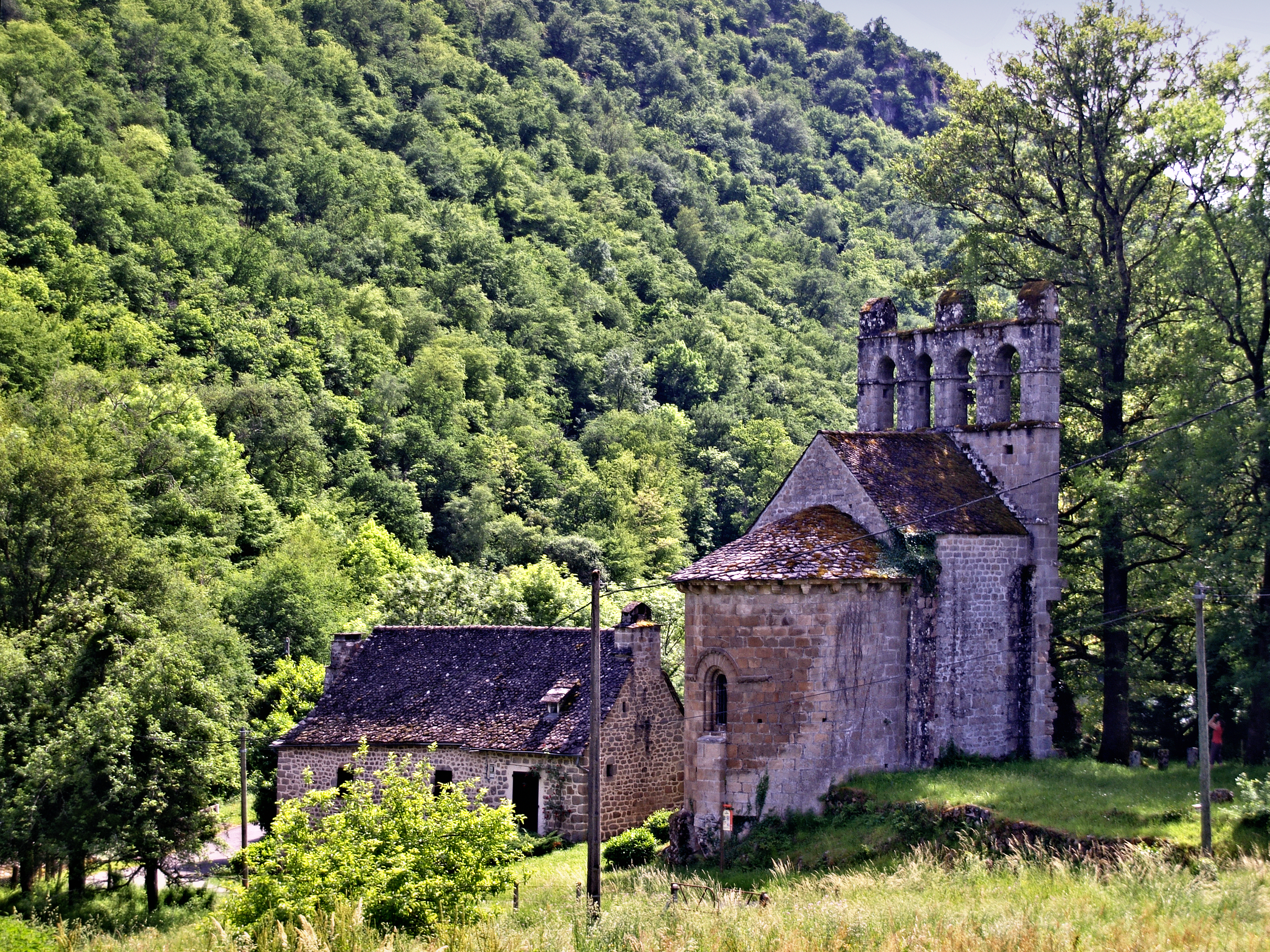
- The Chapel of Glény

- Coat of arms
- Location of Servières-le-Château
- Location within France Location within Nouvelle-Aquitaine
- Coordinates: 45°07′52″N 2°01′33″E
- Country: France
- Region: Nouvelle-Aquitaine
- Department: Corrèze
- Arrondissement: Tulle
- Canton: Argentat-sur-Dordogne

Government
  - Mayor (2020–2026): Hervé Clavière
- Area^{1}: 24.24 km^{2} (9.36 sq mi)
- Elevation: 480 m (1,570 ft)
- Highest elevation: 589 m (1,932 ft)
- Lowest elevation: 195 m (640 ft)
- Population (2023): 563
  - Density: 23.2/km^{2} (60.2/sq mi)
- Time zone: UTC+01:00 (CET)
  - Summer (DST): UTC+02:00 (CEST)
- INSEE/Postal code: 19258 /19220
- ^{1} French Land Register data, which excludes lakes, ponds, glaciers > 1 km^{2} (0.386 sq mi or 247 acres) and river estuaries.

Servières-le-Château (French: [sɛʁvjɛʁ lə ʃɑto]; Occitan: Serviera dau Chasteu) is a commune in the Corrèze department in central France.

== Population ==
Historical population
Year	Pop.	±% p.a.
1968	645	—
1975	618	−0.61%
1982	718	+2.17%
1990	772	+0.91%
1999	720	−0.77%
2007	686	−0.60%
2012	666	−0.59%
2017	613	−1.64%
2023	563	−1.41%
Source: INSEE

== See also ==
- Communes of the Corrèze department
