= Saint-Martial-de-Gimel =

- Commune
- Coat of arms
- Location of Saint-Martial-de-Gimel
- Location within France Location within Nouvelle-Aquitaine
- Coordinates: 45°16′04″N 1°52′25″E
- Country: France
- Region: Nouvelle-Aquitaine
- Department: Corrèze
- Arrondissement: Tulle
- Canton: Sainte-Fortunade
- Intercommunality: CA Tulle Agglo

Government
  - Mayor (2020–2026): Francis Deveix
- Area^{1}: 24.04 km^{2} (9.28 sq mi)
- Elevation: 504 m (1,654 ft)
- Highest elevation: 610 m (2,000 ft)
- Lowest elevation: 307 m (1,007 ft)
- Population (2023): 489
  - Density: 20.3/km^{2} (52.7/sq mi)
- Time zone: UTC+01:00 (CET)
  - Summer (DST): UTC+02:00 (CEST)
- INSEE/Postal code: 19220 /19150
- ^{1} French Land Register data, which excludes lakes, ponds, glaciers > 1 km^{2} (0.386 sq mi or 247 acres) and river estuaries.

Saint-Martial-de-Gimel (French pronunciation: [sɛ̃ maʁsjal də ʒimɛl], literally Saint-Martial of Gimel; Occitan: Sent Marçau de Gimel) is a commune in the Corrèze department in central France.

== Population ==
Historical population
Year	Pop.	±% p.a.
1968	497	—
1975	419	−2.41%
1982	471	+1.69%
1990	487	+0.42%
1999	456	−0.73%
2007	495	+1.03%
2012	462	−1.37%
2017	487	+1.06%
2023	489	+0.07%
Source: INSEE

== See also ==
- Communes of the Corrèze department
