= Saint-Bonnet-Avalouze =

- Part of Laguenne-sur-Avalouze
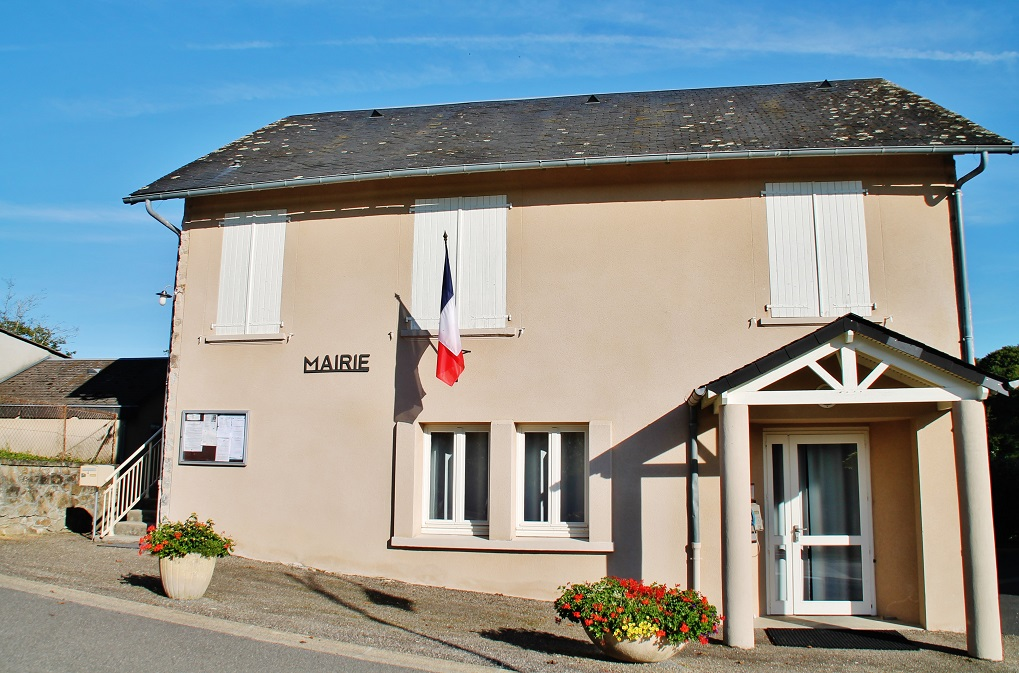
- Town hall

- Coat of arms
- Location of Saint-Bonnet-Avalouze
- Location within France Location within Nouvelle-Aquitaine
- Coordinates: 45°15′25″N 1°49′58″E
- Country: France
- Region: Nouvelle-Aquitaine
- Department: Corrèze
- Arrondissement: Tulle
- Canton: Sainte-Fortunade
- Commune: Laguenne-sur-Avalouze
- Area^{1}: 5.14 km^{2} (1.98 sq mi)
- Elevation: 300 m (980 ft)
- Highest elevation: 467 m (1,532 ft)
- Lowest elevation: 232 m (761 ft)
- Population (2023): 194
  - Density: 37.7/km^{2} (97.8/sq mi)
- Time zone: UTC+01:00 (CET)
  - Summer (DST): UTC+02:00 (CEST)
- Postal code: 19150
- ^{1} French Land Register data, which excludes lakes, ponds, glaciers > 1 km^{2} (0.386 sq mi or 247 acres) and river estuaries.

Saint-Bonnet-Avalouze (French pronunciation: [sɛ̃ bɔnɛ avaluz]; Limousin: Sent Bonet Avalosa) is a village and a former commune in the Corrèze department in central France. Since 1 January 2019, it is part of the new commune of Laguenne-sur-Avalouze.

== See also ==
- Communes of the Corrèze department
