= Laguenne =

Commune in Corrèze, France

- Part of Laguenne-sur-Avalouze
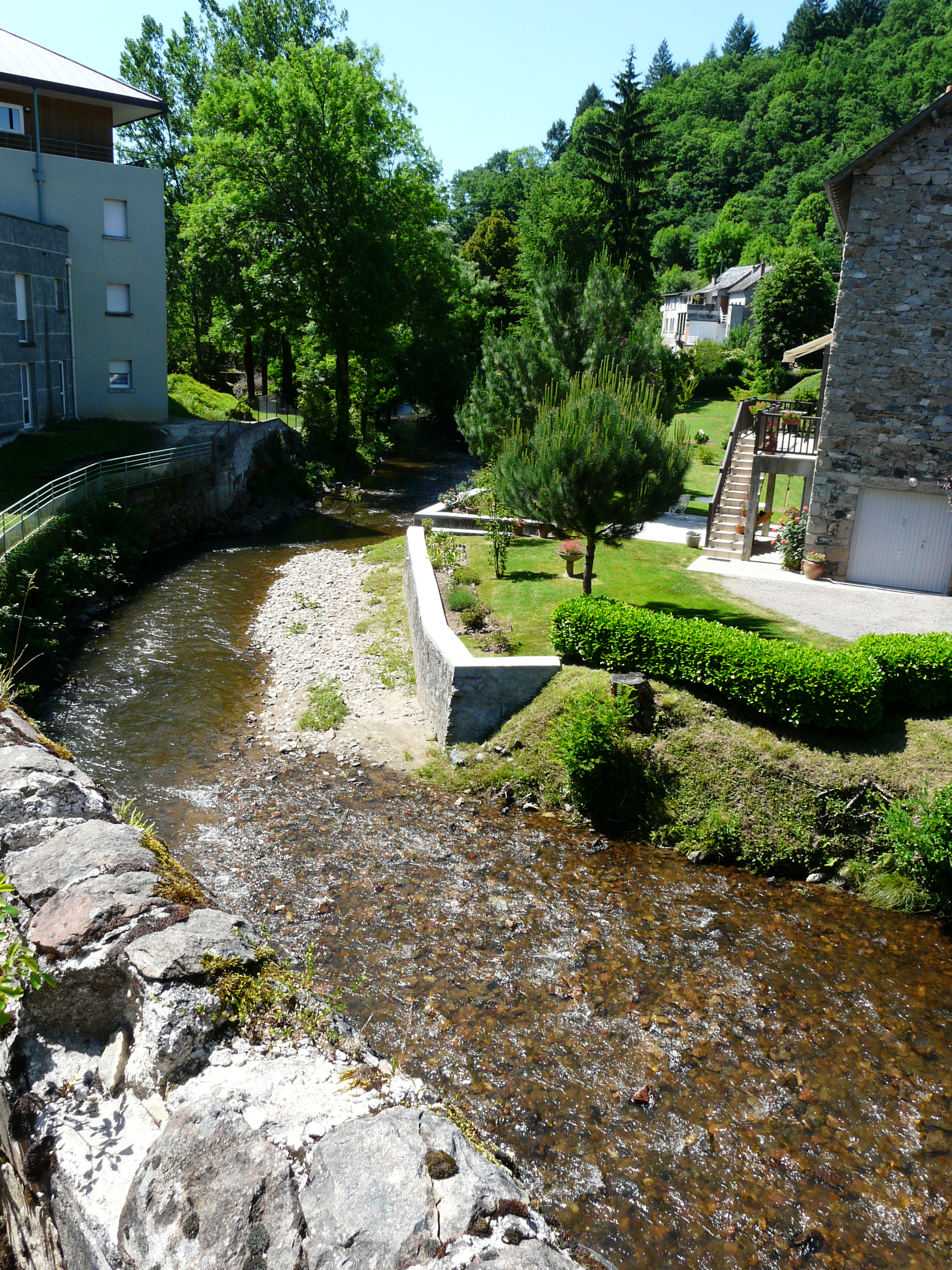
- The Saint-Bonnette river, in Laguenne

- Coat of arms
- Location of Laguenne
- Location within France Location within Nouvelle-Aquitaine
- Coordinates: 45°14′35″N 1°46′56″E
- Country: France
- Region: Nouvelle-Aquitaine
- Department: Corrèze
- Arrondissement: Tulle
- Canton: Sainte-Fortunade
- Commune: Laguenne-sur-Avalouze
- Area^{1}: 7.01 km^{2} (2.71 sq mi)
- Elevation: 220 m (720 ft)
- Highest elevation: 428 m (1,404 ft)
- Lowest elevation: 198 m (650 ft)
- Population (2022): 1,374
  - Density: 196/km^{2} (508/sq mi)
- Time zone: UTC+01:00 (CET)
  - Summer (DST): UTC+02:00 (CEST)
- Postal code: 19150
- ^{1} French Land Register data, which excludes lakes, ponds, glaciers > 1 km^{2} (0.386 sq mi or 247 acres) and river estuaries.

Laguenne (Limousin: Las Guenas) is a village and a former commune in the Corrèze department in central France. Since 1 January 2019, it is part of the new commune of Laguenne-sur-Avalouze.

== Population ==
Historical population

Year	Pop.	±% p.a.
1793	619	—
1821	743	+0.65%
1831	821	+1.00%
1836	913	+2.15%
1841	899	−0.31%
1846	931	+0.70%
1851	914	−0.37%
1856	825	−2.03%
1861	954	+2.95%
1866	919	−0.74%
1872	1,019	+1.74%
1876	1,057	+0.92%
1881	1,041	−0.30%
1886	1,038	−0.06%
1891	1,156	+2.18%
1896	1,071	−1.52%

Year	Pop.	±% p.a.
1901	1,032	−0.74%
1906	984	−0.95%
1911	951	−0.68%
1921	925	−0.28%
1926	908	−0.37%
1931	922	+0.31%
1936	967	+0.96%
1946	1,175	+1.97%
1954	1,194	+0.20%
1962	1,322	+1.28%
1968	1,458	+1.65%
1975	1,610	+1.43%
1982	1,511	−0.90%
1990	1,467	−0.37%
1999	1,448	−0.14%
2022	1,374	−0.23%

Source: EHESS and INSEE

== See also ==
- Communes of the Corrèze department
