= Lagarde-Enval =

- Part of Lagarde-Marc-la-Tour
- Coat of arms
- Location of Lagarde-Enval
- Location within France Location within Nouvelle-Aquitaine
- Coordinates: 45°11′16″N 1°48′30″E
- Country: France
- Region: Nouvelle-Aquitaine
- Department: Corrèze
- Arrondissement: Tulle
- Canton: Sainte-Fortunade
- Commune: Lagarde-Marc-la-Tour
- Area^{1}: 21.55 km^{2} (8.32 sq mi)
- Elevation: 500 m (1,600 ft)
- Highest elevation: 542 m (1,778 ft)
- Lowest elevation: 273 m (896 ft)
- Population (2023): 787
  - Density: 36.5/km^{2} (94.6/sq mi)
- Time zone: UTC+01:00 (CET)
  - Summer (DST): UTC+02:00 (CEST)
- Postal code: 19150
- ^{1} French Land Register data, which excludes lakes, ponds, glaciers > 1 km^{2} (0.386 sq mi or 247 acres) and river estuaries.

Lagarde-Enval (French pronunciation: [laɡaʁd ɑ̃val]; Limousin: La Garda) is a former commune in the Corrèze department in central France. On 1 January 2019, it was merged into the new commune Lagarde-Marc-la-Tour.

== See also ==
- Communes of the Corrèze department
