= Saint-Priest-de-Gimel =

- Commune
- Coat of arms
- Location of Saint-Priest-de-Gimel
- Location within France Location within Nouvelle-Aquitaine
- Coordinates: 45°19′03″N 1°53′23″E
- Country: France
- Region: Nouvelle-Aquitaine
- Department: Corrèze
- Arrondissement: Tulle
- Canton: Sainte-Fortunade
- Intercommunality: CA Tulle Agglo

Government
  - Mayor (2020–2026): Alain Chastre
- Area^{1}: 17.68 km^{2} (6.83 sq mi)
- Elevation: 430 m (1,410 ft)
- Highest elevation: 618 m (2,028 ft)
- Lowest elevation: 480 m (1,570 ft)
- Population (2023): 480
  - Density: 27/km^{2} (70/sq mi)
- Time zone: UTC+01:00 (CET)
  - Summer (DST): UTC+02:00 (CEST)
- INSEE/Postal code: 19236 /19800
- ^{1} French Land Register data, which excludes lakes, ponds, glaciers > 1 km^{2} (0.386 sq mi or 247 acres) and river estuaries.

Saint-Priest-de-Gimel (French pronunciation: [sɛ̃ pʁijɛ(st) də ʒimɛl], literally Saint-Priest of Gimel; Occitan: Sent Préch) is a commune in the Corrèze department in central France. Corrèze station, situated in the commune, has rail connections to Brive-la-Gaillarde, Ussel and Bordeaux.

== Population ==
Historical population
Year	Pop.	±% p.a.
1968	389	—
1975	421	+1.14%
1982	365	−2.02%
1990	412	+1.53%
1999	416	+0.11%
2007	463	+1.35%
2012	470	+0.30%
2017	495	+1.04%
2023	480	−0.51%
Source: INSEE

== See also ==
- Communes of the Corrèze department
