= Marc-la-Tour =

Commune in Corrèze, France

- Part of Lagarde-Marc-la-Tour
- Coat of arms
- Location of Marc-la-Tour
- Location within France Location within Nouvelle-Aquitaine
- Coordinates: 45°12′21″N 1°50′44″E
- Country: France
- Region: Nouvelle-Aquitaine
- Department: Corrèze
- Arrondissement: Tulle
- Canton: Sainte-Fortunade
- Commune: Lagarde-Marc-la-Tour
- Area^{1}: 6.59 km^{2} (2.54 sq mi)
- Elevation: 450 m (1,480 ft)
- Highest elevation: 516 m (1,693 ft)
- Lowest elevation: 259 m (850 ft)
- Population (2023): 141
  - Density: 21.4/km^{2} (55.4/sq mi)
- Time zone: UTC+01:00 (CET)
  - Summer (DST): UTC+02:00 (CEST)
- Postal code: 19150
- ^{1} French Land Register data, which excludes lakes, ponds, glaciers > 1 km^{2} (0.386 sq mi or 247 acres) and river estuaries.

Marc-la-Tour (French pronunciation: [maʁk la tuʁ]; Limousin: Marc la Tor) is a former commune in the Corrèze department in central France. On 1 January 2019, it was merged into the new commune Lagarde-Marc-la-Tour.

== See also ==
- Communes of the Corrèze department
