= Ladignac-sur-Rondelles =

- Commune
- Coat of arms
- Location of Ladignac-sur-Rondelles
- Location within France Location within Nouvelle-Aquitaine
- Coordinates: 45°14′03″N 1°50′19″E
- Country: France
- Region: Nouvelle-Aquitaine
- Department: Corrèze
- Arrondissement: Tulle
- Canton: Sainte-Fortunade
- Intercommunality: CA Tulle Agglo

Government
  - Mayor (2020–2026): Serge Hébrard
- Area^{1}: 10.18 km^{2} (3.93 sq mi)
- Elevation: 450 m (1,480 ft)
- Highest elevation: 470 m (1,540 ft)
- Lowest elevation: 273 m (896 ft)
- Population (2023): 404
  - Density: 39.7/km^{2} (103/sq mi)
- Time zone: UTC+01:00 (CET)
  - Summer (DST): UTC+02:00 (CEST)
- INSEE/Postal code: 19096 /19150
- ^{1} French Land Register data, which excludes lakes, ponds, glaciers > 1 km^{2} (0.386 sq mi or 247 acres) and river estuaries.

Ladignac-sur-Rondelles (French pronunciation: [ladiɲak syʁ ʁɔ̃dɛl]; Occitan: Ladinhac) is a commune in the Corrèze department in central France.

== Population ==
Historical population
Year	Pop.	±% p.a.
1968	304	—
1975	292	−0.57%
1982	345	+2.41%
1990	408	+2.12%
1999	408	+0.00%
2007	441	+0.98%
2012	427	−0.64%
2017	406	−1.00%
2023	404	−0.08%
Source: INSEE

== See also ==
- Communes of the Corrèze department
