= Champagnac-la-Prune =

- Commune
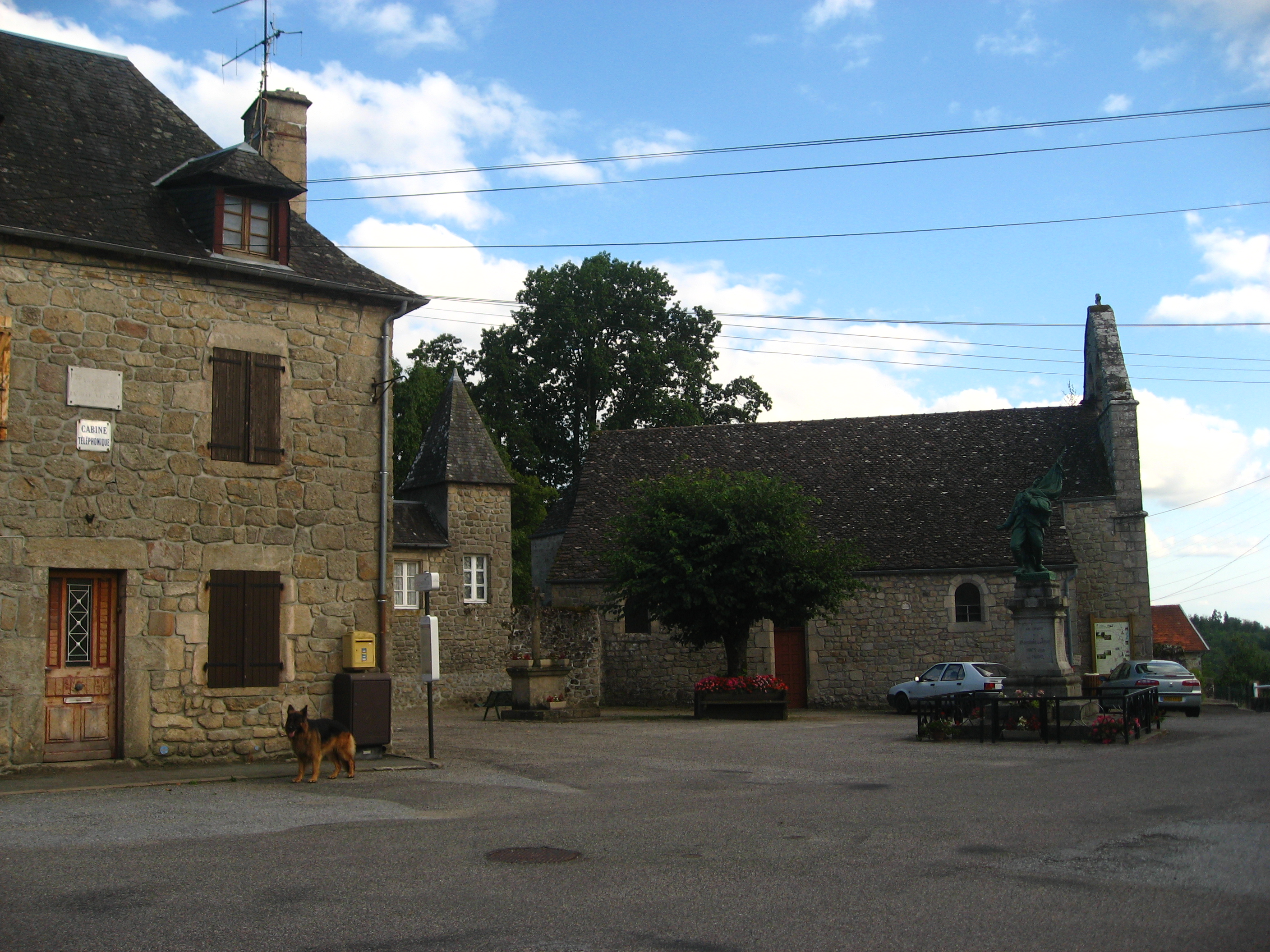
- The church and surrounding buildings in Champagnac-la-Prune

- Coat of arms
- Location of Champagnac-la-Prune
- Location within France Location within Nouvelle-Aquitaine
- Coordinates: 45°11′11″N 1°57′06″E
- Country: France
- Region: Nouvelle-Aquitaine
- Department: Corrèze
- Arrondissement: Tulle
- Canton: Sainte-Fortunade
- Intercommunality: CA Tulle Agglo

Government
  - Mayor (2020–2026): Christelle Bidault
- Area^{1}: 13.27 km^{2} (5.12 sq mi)
- Elevation: 400 m (1,300 ft)
- Highest elevation: 546 m (1,791 ft)
- Lowest elevation: 246 m (807 ft)
- Population (2023): 150
  - Density: 11/km^{2} (29/sq mi)
- Time zone: UTC+01:00 (CET)
  - Summer (DST): UTC+02:00 (CEST)
- INSEE/Postal code: 19040 /19320
- ^{1} French Land Register data, which excludes lakes, ponds, glaciers > 1 km^{2} (0.386 sq mi or 247 acres) and river estuaries.

Champagnac-la-Prune (French pronunciation: [ʃɑ̃paɲak la pʁyn]; Occitan: Champanhac la Pruna) is a commune in the central French department of Corrèze.

== Population ==
Historical population
Year	Pop.	±% p.a.
1968	282	—
1975	263	−0.99%
1982	219	−2.58%
1990	167	−3.33%
1999	160	−0.47%
2007	166	+0.46%
2012	166	+0.00%
2017	163	−0.36%
2023	150	−1.38%
Source: INSEE

== See also ==
- Communes of the Corrèze department
