= Lagarde-Marc-la-Tour =

- Commune
- Location of Lagarde-Marc-la-Tour
- Location within France Location within Nouvelle-Aquitaine
- Coordinates: 45°11′16″N 1°48′30″E
- Country: France
- Region: Nouvelle-Aquitaine
- Department: Corrèze
- Arrondissement: Tulle
- Canton: Sainte-Fortunade
- Intercommunality: CA Tulle Agglo

Government
  - Mayor (2020–2026): Daniel Ringenbach
- Area^{1}: 28.14 km^{2} (10.86 sq mi)
- Highest elevation: 542 m (1,778 ft)
- Lowest elevation: 259 m (850 ft)
- Population (2023): 928
  - Density: 33.0/km^{2} (85.4/sq mi)
- Time zone: UTC+01:00 (CET)
  - Summer (DST): UTC+02:00 (CEST)
- INSEE/Postal code: 19098 /19150
- ^{1} French Land Register data, which excludes lakes, ponds, glaciers > 1 km^{2} (0.386 sq mi or 247 acres) and river estuaries.

Lagarde-Marc-la-Tour (French pronunciation: [laɡaʁd maʁk la tuʁ]) is a commune in the Corrèze department in central France. It was established on 1 January 2019 by merger of the former communes of Lagarde-Enval (the seat) and Marc-la-Tour.

== See also ==
- Communes of the Corrèze department
