= Saint-Paul, Corrèze =

Saint-Paul
- Commune
- Coat of arms
- Location of Saint-Paul
- Location within France Location within Nouvelle-Aquitaine
- Coordinates: 45°13′12″N 1°53′46″E
- Country: France
- Region: Nouvelle-Aquitaine
- Department: Corrèze
- Arrondissement: Tulle
- Canton: Sainte-Fortunade
- Intercommunality: CA Tulle Agglo

Government
  - Mayor (2020–2026): Stéphanie Vallée
- Area^{1}: 14.1 km^{2} (5.4 sq mi)
- Elevation: 500 m (1,600 ft)
- Highest elevation: 574 m (1,883 ft)
- Lowest elevation: 269 m (883 ft)
- Population (2023): 232
  - Density: 16.5/km^{2} (42.6/sq mi)
- Time zone: UTC+01:00 (CET)
  - Summer (DST): UTC+02:00 (CEST)
- INSEE/Postal code: 19235 /19150
- ^{1} French Land Register data, which excludes lakes, ponds, glaciers > 1 km^{2} (0.386 sq mi or 247 acres) and river estuaries.

Saint-Paul (French pronunciation: [sɛ̃ pɔl]; Limousin: Sent Pau) is a commune in the Corrèze department in central France.

== Population ==
Historical population
Year	Pop.	±% p.a.
1968	310	—
1975	259	−2.54%
1982	232	−1.56%
1990	236	+0.21%
1999	237	+0.05%
2007	231	−0.32%
2012	214	−1.52%
2017	221	+0.65%
2023	232	+0.81%
Source: INSEE

== See also ==
- Communes of the Corrèze department
