= Sainte-Fortunade =

- Commune
- Coat of arms
- Location of Sainte-Fortunade
- Location within France Location within Nouvelle-Aquitaine
- Coordinates: 45°12′26″N 1°46′21″E
- Country: France
- Region: Nouvelle-Aquitaine
- Department: Corrèze
- Arrondissement: Tulle
- Canton: Sainte-Fortunade
- Intercommunality: CA Tulle Agglo

Government
  - Mayor (2026–2032): Frédéric Bouysson
- Area^{1}: 38.31 km^{2} (14.79 sq mi)
- Highest elevation: 585 m (1,919 ft)
- Lowest elevation: 187 m (614 ft)
- Population (2023): 1,798
  - Density: 46.93/km^{2} (121.6/sq mi)
- Time zone: UTC+01:00 (CET)
  - Summer (DST): UTC+02:00 (CEST)
- INSEE/Postal code: 19203 /19490
- ^{1} French Land Register data, which excludes lakes, ponds, glaciers > 1 km^{2} (0.386 sq mi or 247 acres) and river estuaries.

Sainte-Fortunade (French pronunciation: [sɛ̃t fɔʁtynad]; Limousin: Senta Fortunada) is a commune in the Corrèze department in central France.

== Toponymy ==
The name Sainte-Fortunade refers to Saint Faustus, a Christian martyr of the 4th century whose relics were transferred to Brivezac (about twenty kilometers away) in the 9th century.

== History ==
On 8 June 1944, the 2nd SS Panzer Division Das Reich burnt the village of Quatre Routes d'Albussac, located on the D940 road, before murdering an old man and burning his house in Grelet de Sainte-Fortunade, then continued to Tulle where they carried out the Tulle massacre.

== Population ==
Historical population
Year	Pop.	±% p.a.
1968	1,378	—
1975	1,360	−0.19%
1982	1,619	+2.52%
1990	1,605	−0.11%
1999	1,716	+0.75%
2007	1,762	+0.33%
2012	1,787	+0.28%
2017	1,784	−0.03%
2023	1,798	+0.13%
Source: INSEE

== Local culture and heritage ==
=== Places and monuments ===
- Château de Sainte-Fortunade - 15th-century, the castle was built by the Lavaur de Sainte-Fortunade family who still owned it until around 1950. It has a round tower, a spiral staircase and monumental rooms. It is set in a 19th century park with an orangery, now transformed into a village hall. Its facades and roofs were listed as historical monuments in 1997;
- The Château de la Morguie - a castle from the 12th century, has been partially listed since 1985;
- The apse and bell tower of the Église Saint-Martial de Sainte-Fortunade have been listed since 1927.
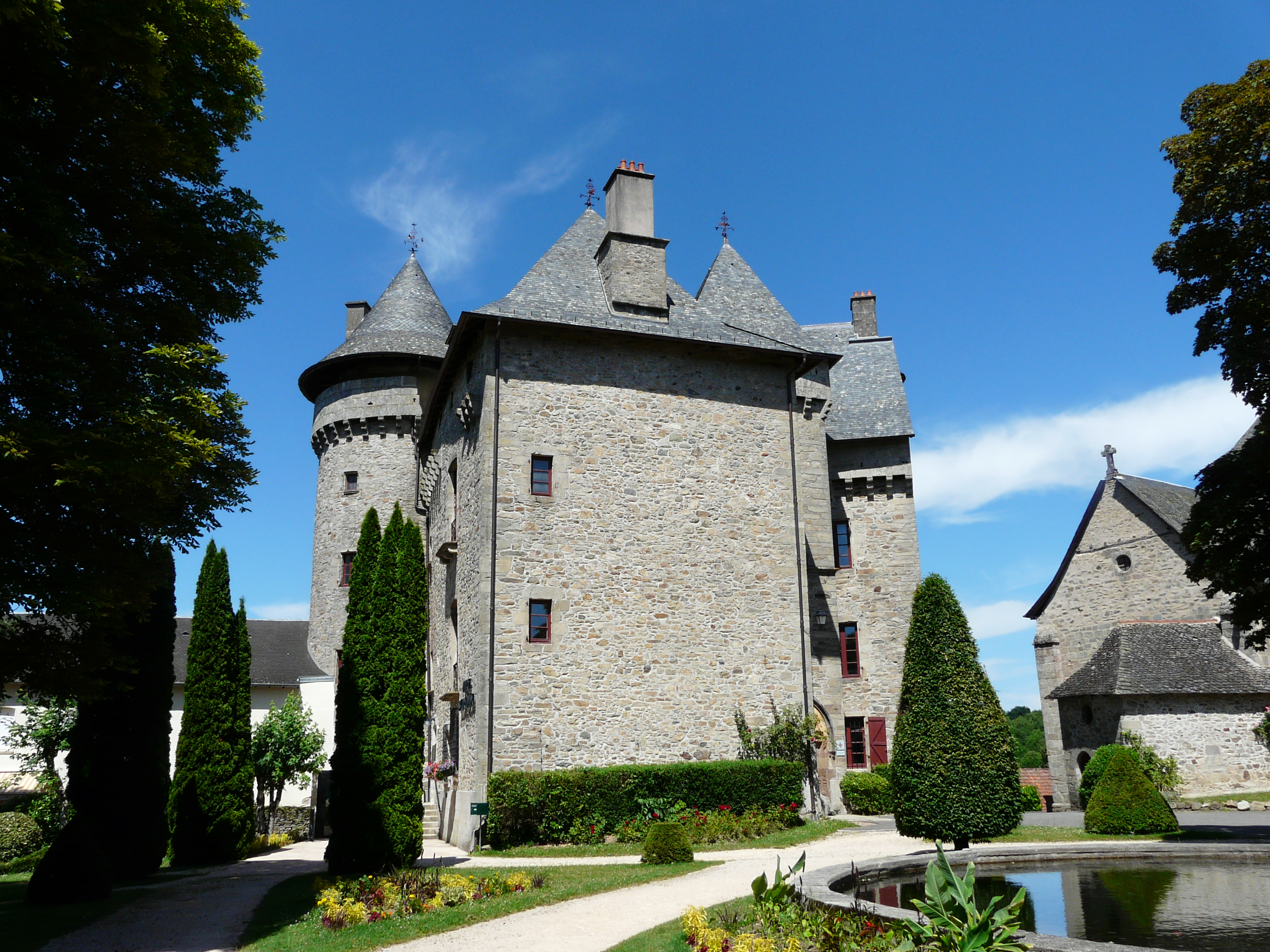
Le Château de Sainte-Fortunade.

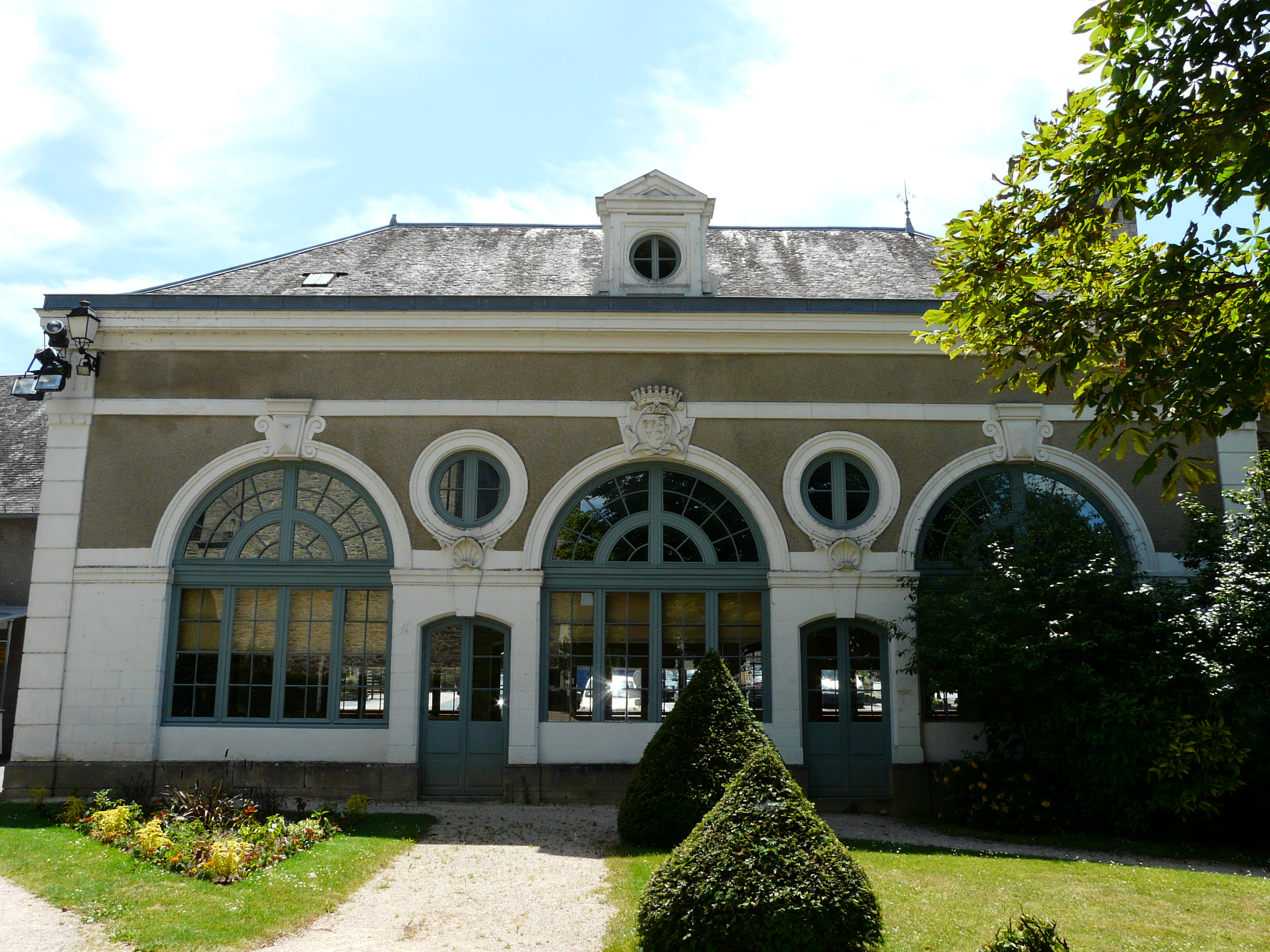
L'ancienne Orangerie.

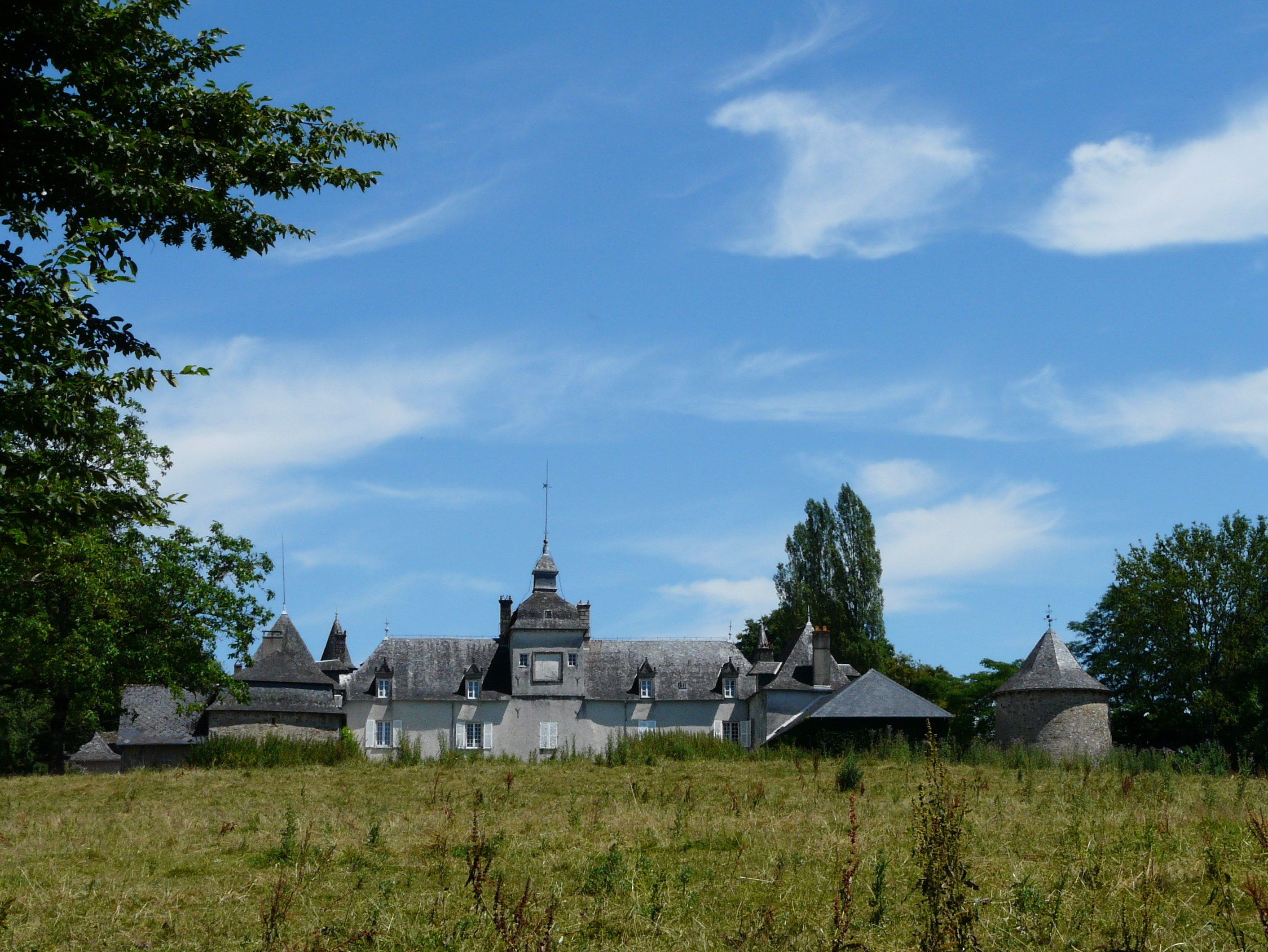
Le Château de la Morguie.

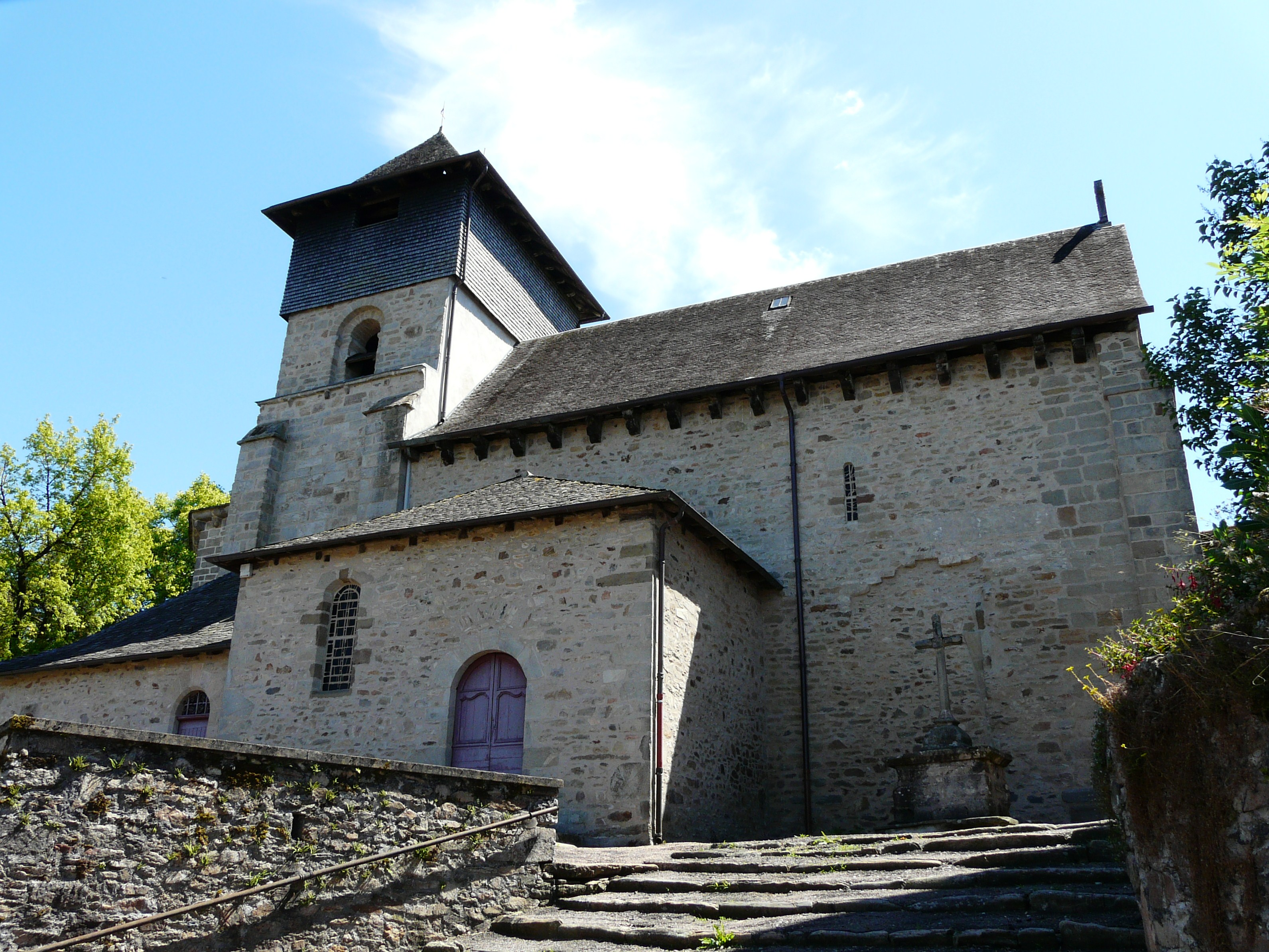
L'Église Saint-Martial.

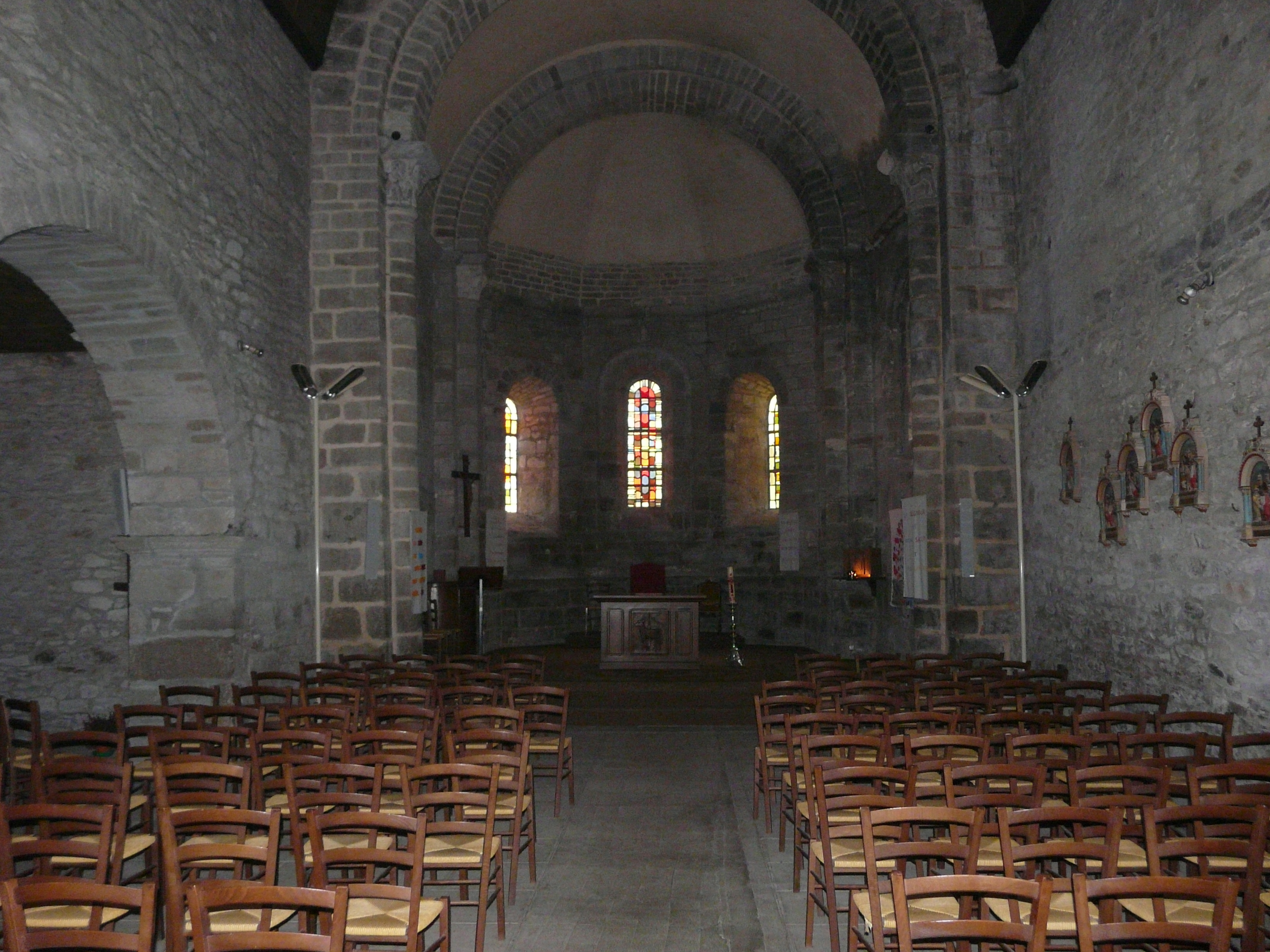
Nave.

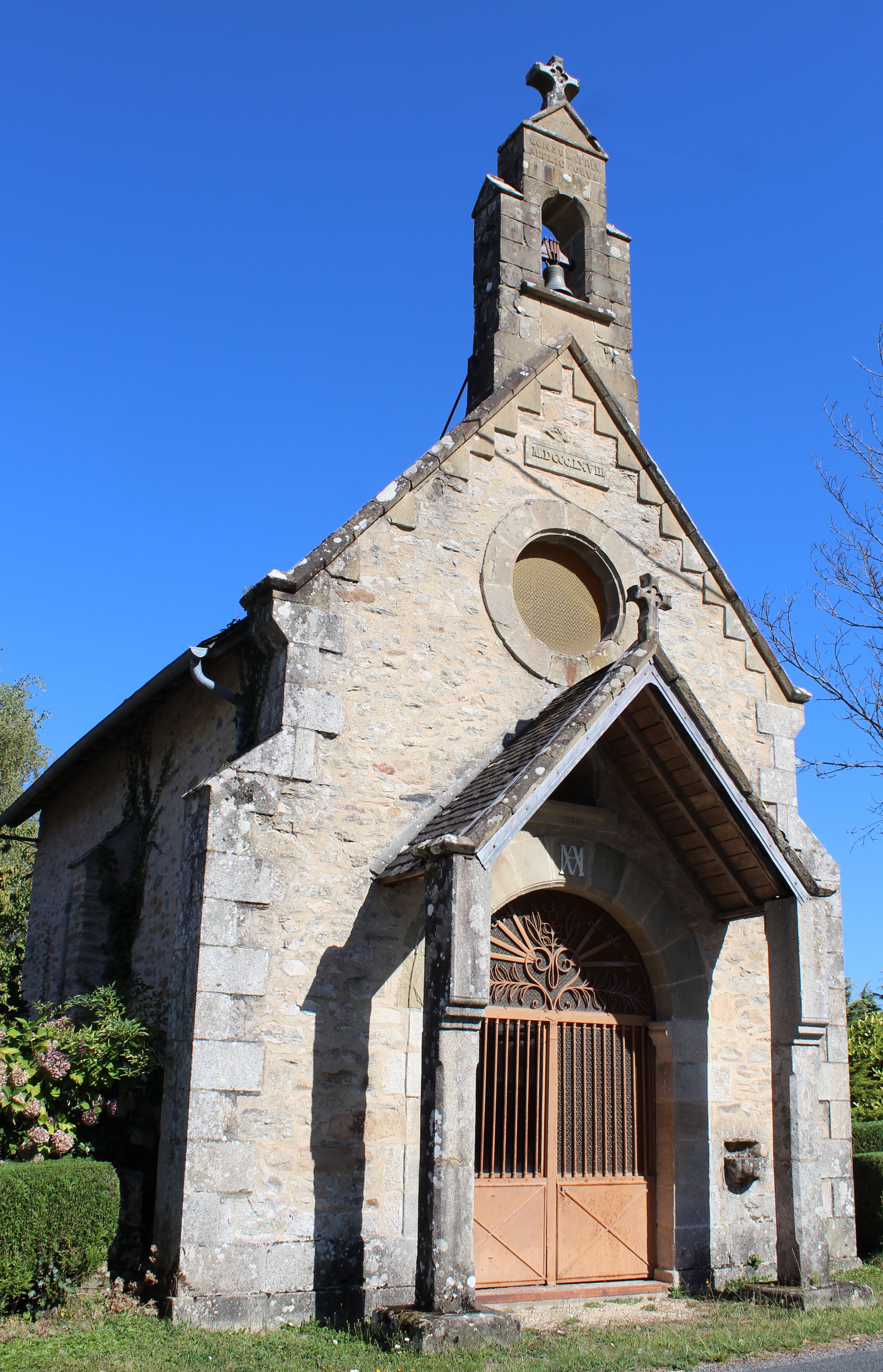
La chapelle.

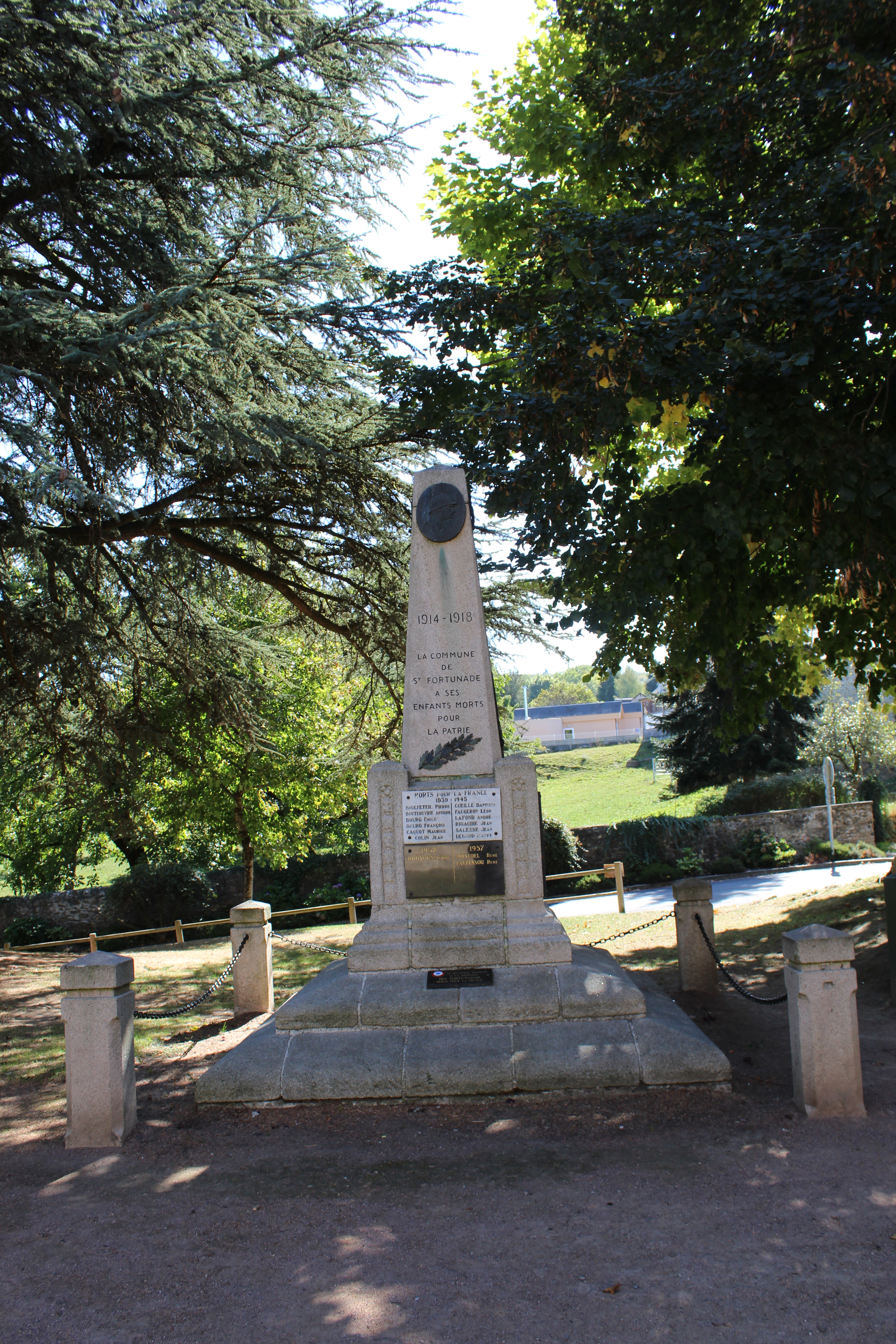
The monument to the war dead.

== See also ==
- Communes of the Corrèze department
