= Pandrignes =

- Commune
- Coat of arms
- Location of Pandrignes
- Location within France Location within Nouvelle-Aquitaine
- Coordinates: 45°13′46″N 1°51′19″E
- Country: France
- Region: Nouvelle-Aquitaine
- Department: Corrèze
- Arrondissement: Tulle
- Canton: Sainte-Fortunade
- Intercommunality: CA Tulle Agglo

Government
  - Mayor (2020–2026): Béatrice Goron
- Area^{1}: 8.45 km^{2} (3.26 sq mi)
- Elevation: 290 m (950 ft)
- Highest elevation: 561 m (1,841 ft)
- Lowest elevation: 314 m (1,030 ft)
- Population (2023): 172
  - Density: 20.4/km^{2} (52.7/sq mi)
- Time zone: UTC+01:00 (CET)
  - Summer (DST): UTC+02:00 (CEST)
- INSEE/Postal code: 19158 /19150
- ^{1} French Land Register data, which excludes lakes, ponds, glaciers > 1 km^{2} (0.386 sq mi or 247 acres) and river estuaries.

Pandrignes (French pronunciation: [pɑ̃dʁiɲ]; Occitan: Pandrinhas) is a commune in the Corrèze department in central France.

== Population ==
Historical population
Year	Pop.	±% p.a.
1968	181	—
1975	152	−2.46%
1982	126	−2.64%
1990	139	+1.23%
1999	155	+1.22%
2007	170	+1.16%
2012	169	−0.12%
2017	166	−0.36%
2023	172	+0.59%
Source: INSEE

== See also ==
- Communes of the Corrèze department
