= Gros-Chastang =

- Commune
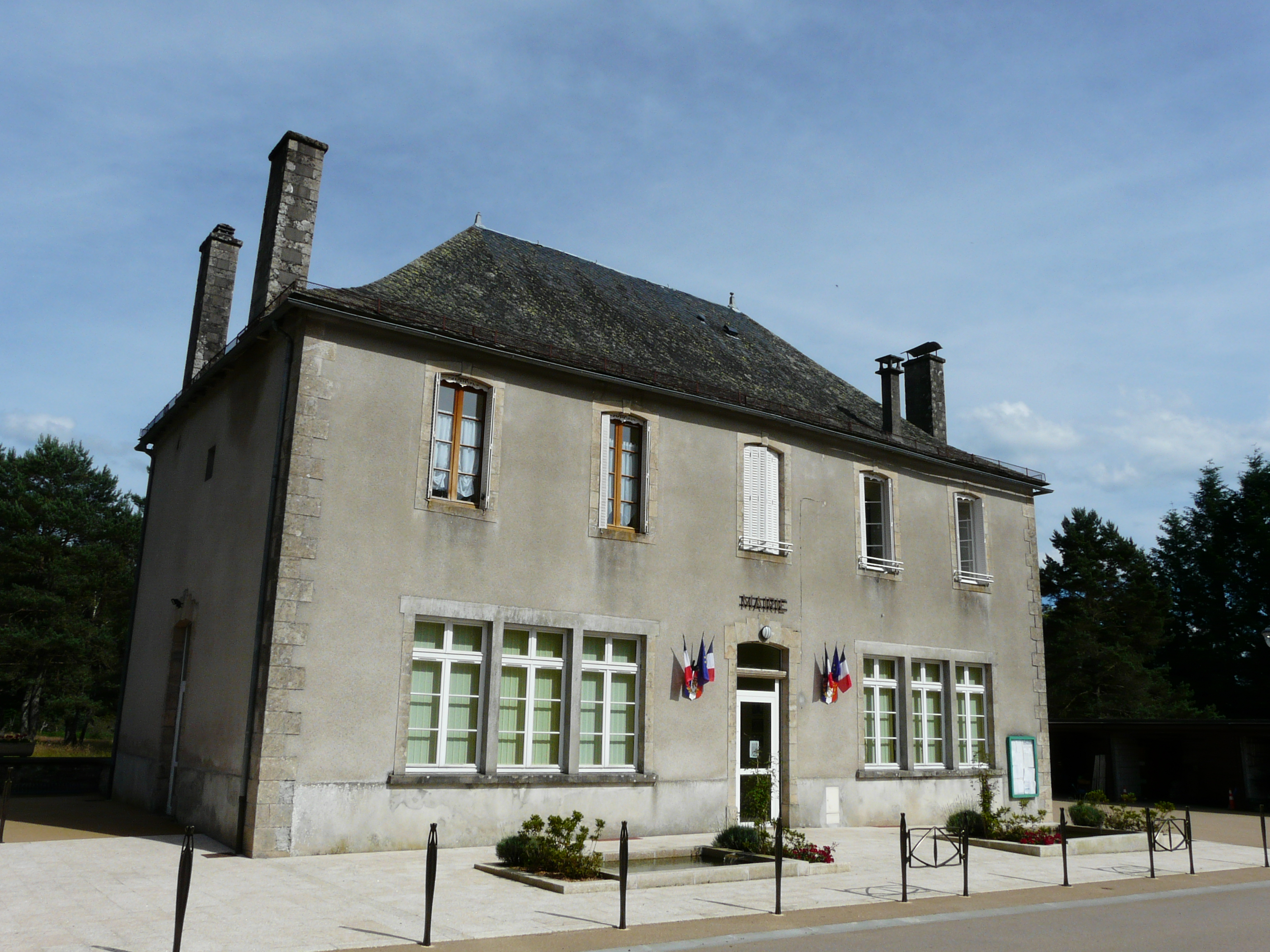
- Town hall

- Coat of arms
- Location of Gros-Chastang
- Location within France Location within Nouvelle-Aquitaine
- Coordinates: 45°12′40″N 1°59′20″E
- Country: France
- Region: Nouvelle-Aquitaine
- Department: Corrèze
- Arrondissement: Tulle
- Canton: Sainte-Fortunade
- Intercommunality: CA Tulle Agglo

Government
  - Mayor (2020–2026): Christian Madelrieux
- Area^{1}: 13.37 km^{2} (5.16 sq mi)
- Elevation: 450 m (1,480 ft)
- Highest elevation: 546 m (1,791 ft)
- Lowest elevation: 260 m (850 ft)
- Population (2023): 181
  - Density: 13.5/km^{2} (35.1/sq mi)
- Time zone: UTC+01:00 (CET)
  - Summer (DST): UTC+02:00 (CEST)
- INSEE/Postal code: 19089 /19320
- ^{1} French Land Register data, which excludes lakes, ponds, glaciers > 1 km^{2} (0.386 sq mi or 247 acres) and river estuaries.

Gros-Chastang is a commune in the Corrèze department in central France.

== Population ==
Historical population
Year	Pop.	±% p.a.
1968	210	—
1975	193	−1.20%
1982	166	−2.13%
1990	177	+0.81%
1999	174	−0.19%
2007	172	−0.14%
2012	172	+0.00%
2017	181	+1.03%
2023	181	+0.00%
Source: INSEE

== See also ==
- Communes of the Corrèze department
