= Le Chastang =

- Commune
- Coat of arms
- Location of Le Chastang
- Location within France Location within Nouvelle-Aquitaine
- Coordinates: 45°10′22″N 1°44′10″E
- Country: France
- Region: Nouvelle-Aquitaine
- Department: Corrèze
- Arrondissement: Tulle
- Canton: Sainte-Fortunade
- Intercommunality: CA Tulle Agglo

Government
  - Mayor (2020–2026): Florent Moussour
- Area^{1}: 7.87 km^{2} (3.04 sq mi)
- Elevation: 470 m (1,540 ft)
- Highest elevation: 553 m (1,814 ft)
- Lowest elevation: 436 m (1,430 ft)
- Population (2023): 349
  - Density: 44.3/km^{2} (115/sq mi)
- Time zone: UTC+01:00 (CET)
  - Summer (DST): UTC+02:00 (CEST)
- INSEE/Postal code: 19048 /19190
- ^{1} French Land Register data, which excludes lakes, ponds, glaciers > 1 km^{2} (0.386 sq mi or 247 acres) and river estuaries.

Le Chastang (French pronunciation: [lə ʃastɑ̃]; Occitan: Lo Chastanh) is a commune in the Corrèze department in central France.

== Population ==
Historical population
Year	Pop.	±% p.a.
1968	251	—
1975	264	+0.72%
1982	288	+1.25%
1990	300	+0.51%
1999	308	+0.29%
2007	330	+0.87%
2012	366	+2.09%
2017	365	−0.05%
2023	349	−0.74%
Source: INSEE

== See also ==
- Communes of the Corrèze department
