= Gumond =

Gumont
- Commune
- Coat of arms
- Location of Gumont
- Location within France Location within Nouvelle-Aquitaine
- Coordinates: 45°13′17″N 1°58′47″E
- Country: France
- Region: Nouvelle-Aquitaine
- Department: Corrèze
- Arrondissement: Tulle
- Canton: Sainte-Fortunade
- Intercommunality: CA Tulle Agglo

Government
  - Mayor (2020–2026): Jean-Pierre Peuch
- Area^{1}: 9.87 km^{2} (3.81 sq mi)
- Elevation: 480 m (1,570 ft)
- Highest elevation: 546 m (1,791 ft)
- Lowest elevation: 350 m (1,150 ft)
- Population (2023): 99
  - Density: 10/km^{2} (26/sq mi)
- Time zone: UTC+01:00 (CET)
  - Summer (DST): UTC+02:00 (CEST)
- INSEE/Postal code: 19090 /19320
- ^{1} French Land Register data, which excludes lakes, ponds, glaciers > 1 km^{2} (0.386 sq mi or 247 acres) and river estuaries.

Gumond (French pronunciation: [ɡymɔ̃]; Occitan: Agutmont) is a commune in the Corrèze department of central France.

== Population ==
Historical population
Year	Pop.	±% p.a.
1968	119	—
1975	110	−1.12%
1982	93	−2.37%
1990	80	−1.86%
1999	104	+2.96%
2007	114	+1.15%
2012	96	−3.38%
2017	95	−0.21%
2023	99	+0.69%
Source: INSEE

== See also ==
- Communes of the Corrèze department
