= Espagnac =

- Commune
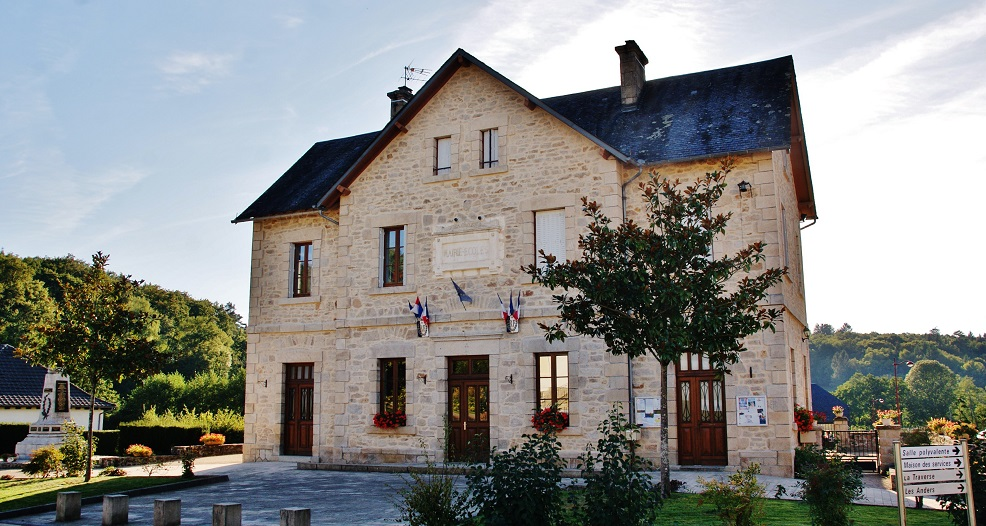

- Coat of arms
- Location of Espagnac
- Location within France Location within Nouvelle-Aquitaine
- Coordinates: 45°13′12″N 1°53′56″E
- Country: France
- Region: Nouvelle-Aquitaine
- Department: Corrèze
- Arrondissement: Tulle
- Canton: Sainte-Fortunade
- Intercommunality: CA Tulle Agglo

Government
  - Mayor (2020–2026): Marie-Christine Faure
- Area^{1}: 23.63 km^{2} (9.12 sq mi)
- Elevation: 500 m (1,600 ft)
- Highest elevation: 564 m (1,850 ft)
- Lowest elevation: 302 m (991 ft)
- Population (2023): 381
  - Density: 16.1/km^{2} (41.8/sq mi)
- Time zone: UTC+01:00 (CET)
  - Summer (DST): UTC+02:00 (CEST)
- INSEE/Postal code: 19075 /19150
- ^{1} French Land Register data, which excludes lakes, ponds, glaciers > 1 km^{2} (0.386 sq mi or 247 acres) and river estuaries.

Espagnac (French pronunciation: [ɛspaɲak]; Occitan: Espanhac) is a commune in the Corrèze department in central France.

== Geography ==
The landscape is typically wooded hills.

== Economy ==
The main economic activity is cattle raising though it now benefits from the recent trend of rural tourism.

== History ==
Though evidences of Neolithic and Celtic occupation exist on the commune's territory, the village itself was probably only founded during or after the Gallo-Roman era, near the site of a villa not yet excavated. Some evidence suggest the presence of other villas and of a tile factory. The name of the village if of Latin origin, possibly derived from a family name.

During the Middle Ages, Espagnac seems to have become a dwelling of local importance, as attested by the existence of a Merovingian mint (three gold coins with the mention "Spaniaco Fit" have been found), of a large cemetery where sarcophagi have been exhumed and of an abbey. It seems to have been the head of a Carolingian vicaria. The first written mention of its name appears in the will of Adhemar des Echelles, around 930 AD.

Then dependent on the abbey of Tulle, Espagnac devolved during the late Middle Ages, and both the abbey and the church were burnt down by the troops of Gaspard de Coligny during the Wars of Religion. The current church dates back from the late 16th century. A small restored Carolingian Chapel and the privately owned medieval castle of Puy-de-Val are also present on the territory of the commune.

== Population ==
Historical population
Year	Pop.	±% p.a.
1968	367	—
1975	330	−1.51%
1982	343	+0.55%
1990	338	−0.18%
1999	339	+0.03%
2007	339	+0.00%
2012	338	−0.06%
2017	377	+2.21%
2023	381	+0.18%
Source: INSEE

== See also ==
- Communes of the Corrèze department
