= Saint-Pardoux-la-Croisille =

- Commune
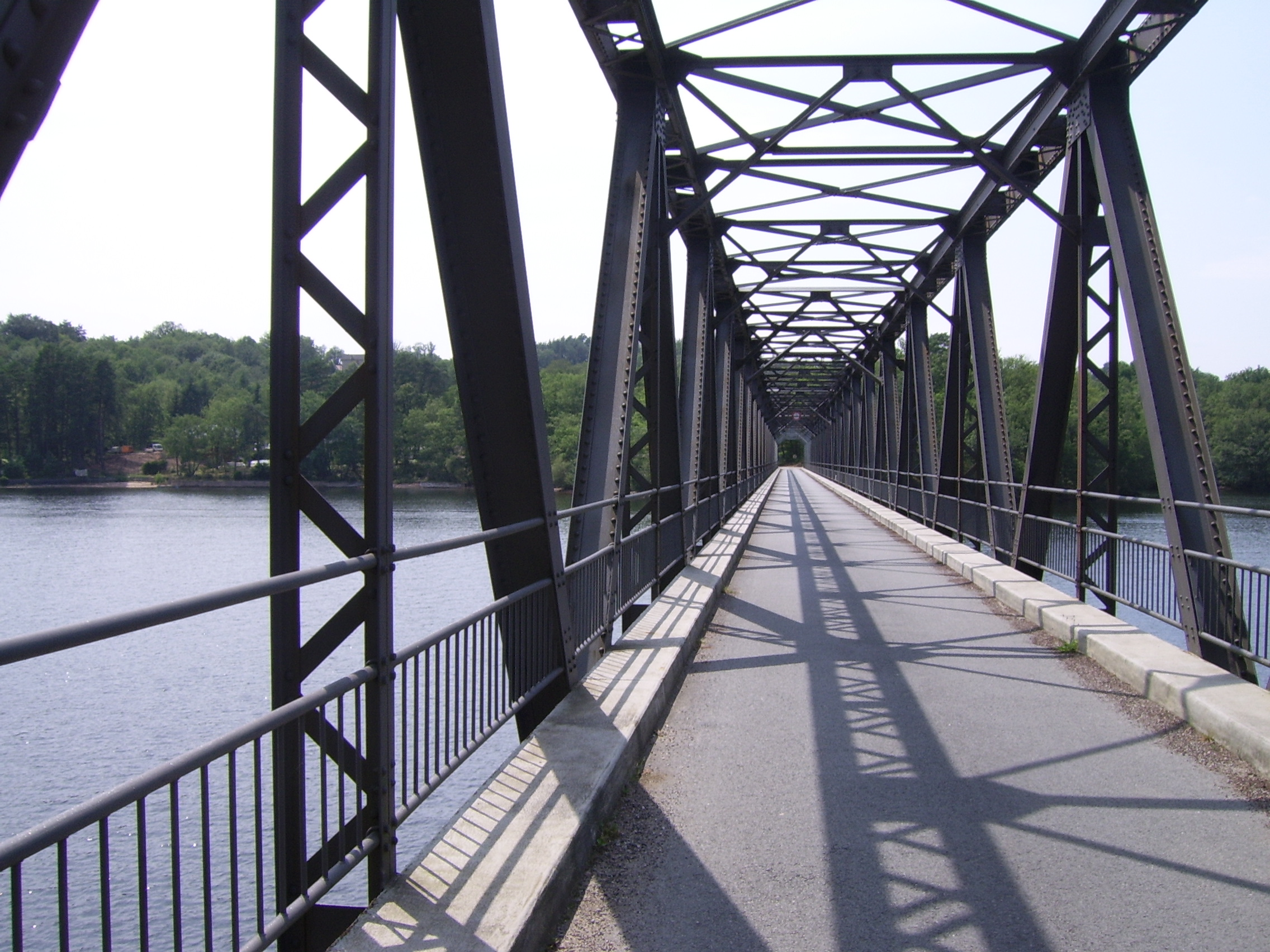
- Lantourne viaduct near Marcillac-la-Croisille

- Coat of arms
- Location of Saint-Pardoux-la-Croisille
- Location within France Location within Nouvelle-Aquitaine
- Coordinates: 45°14′47″N 1°58′59″E
- Country: France
- Region: Nouvelle-Aquitaine
- Department: Corrèze
- Arrondissement: Tulle
- Canton: Sainte-Fortunade
- Intercommunality: CA Tulle Agglo

Government
  - Mayor (2020–2026): Dominique Albaret
- Area^{1}: 16.36 km^{2} (6.32 sq mi)
- Elevation: 520 m (1,710 ft)
- Highest elevation: 564 m (1,850 ft)
- Lowest elevation: 424 m (1,391 ft)
- Population (2023): 176
  - Density: 10.8/km^{2} (27.9/sq mi)
- Time zone: UTC+01:00 (CET)
  - Summer (DST): UTC+02:00 (CEST)
- INSEE/Postal code: 19231 /19320
- ^{1} French Land Register data, which excludes lakes, ponds, glaciers > 1 km^{2} (0.386 sq mi or 247 acres) and river estuaries.

Saint-Pardoux-la-Croisille (French pronunciation: [sɛ̃ paʁdu la kʁwazij]; Occitan: Sent Pardos la Crosilha) is a commune in the Corrèze department in central France.

== Population ==
Historical population
Year	Pop.	±% p.a.
1968	240	—
1975	176	−4.33%
1982	168	−0.66%
1990	173	+0.37%
1999	157	−1.07%
2007	169	+0.92%
2012	174	+0.58%
2017	177	+0.34%
2023	176	−0.09%
Source: INSEE

== See also ==
- Communes of the Corrèze department
