= Laguenne-sur-Avalouze =

- Commune
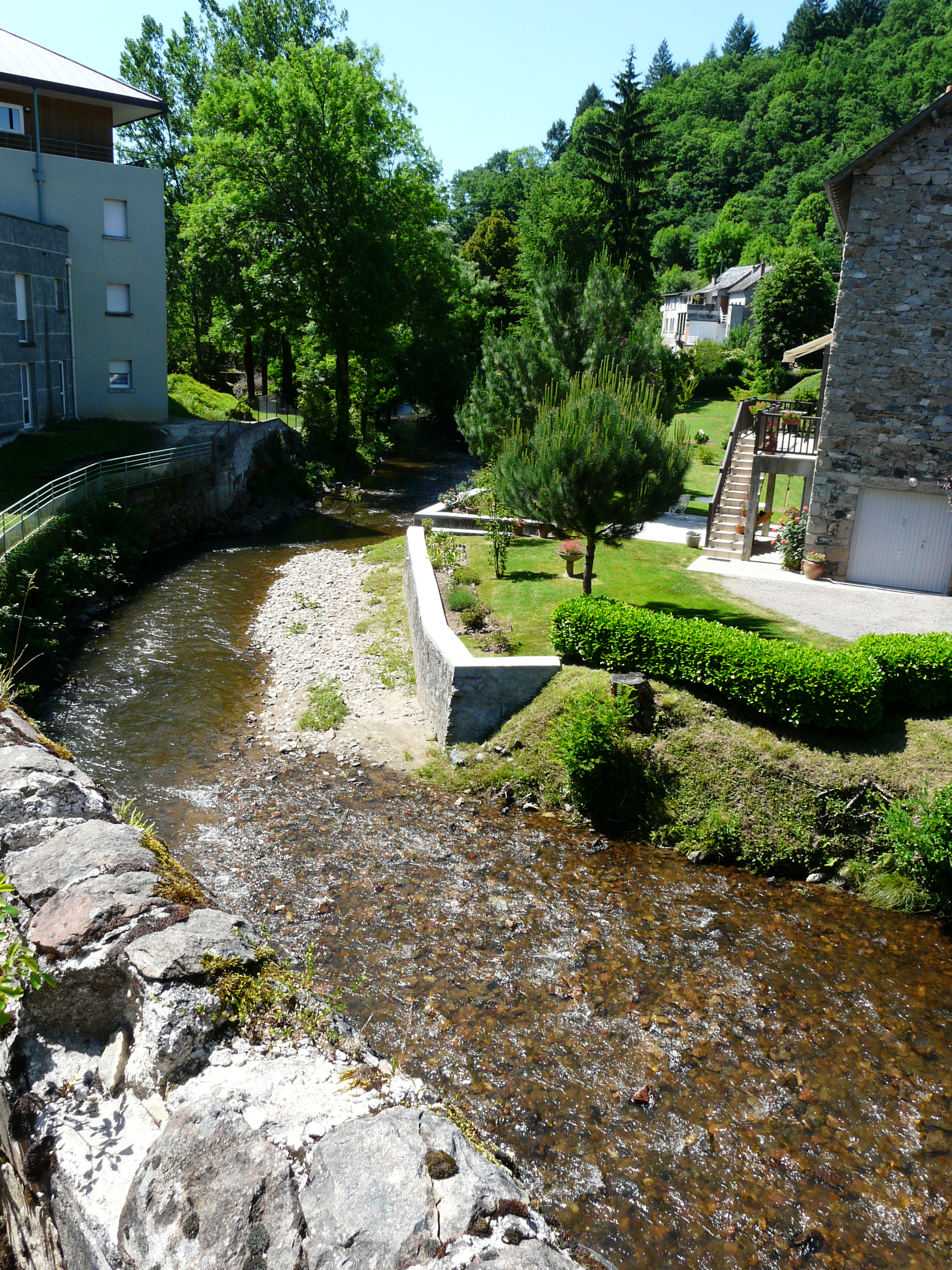
- The river Saint-Bonnette, in Laguenne
- Location of Laguenne-sur-Avalouze
- Location within France Location within Nouvelle-Aquitaine
- Coordinates: 45°14′35″N 1°46′56″E
- Country: France
- Region: Nouvelle-Aquitaine
- Department: Corrèze
- Arrondissement: Tulle
- Canton: Sainte-Fortunade
- Intercommunality: CA Tulle Agglo
- Area^{1}: 12.15 km^{2} (4.69 sq mi)
- Highest elevation: 467 m (1,532 ft)
- Lowest elevation: 198 m (650 ft)
- Population (2023): 1,577
  - Density: 129.8/km^{2} (336.2/sq mi)
- Time zone: UTC+01:00 (CET)
  - Summer (DST): UTC+02:00 (CEST)
- INSEE/Postal code: 19101 /19150
- ^{1} French Land Register data, which excludes lakes, ponds, glaciers > 1 km^{2} (0.386 sq mi or 247 acres) and river estuaries.

Laguenne-sur-Avalouze is a commune in the Corrèze department in central France. It was established on 1 January 2019 by merger of the former communes of Laguenne (the seat) and Saint-Bonnet-Avalouze.

== See also ==
- Communes of the Corrèze department
