= La Roche-Canillac =

- Commune
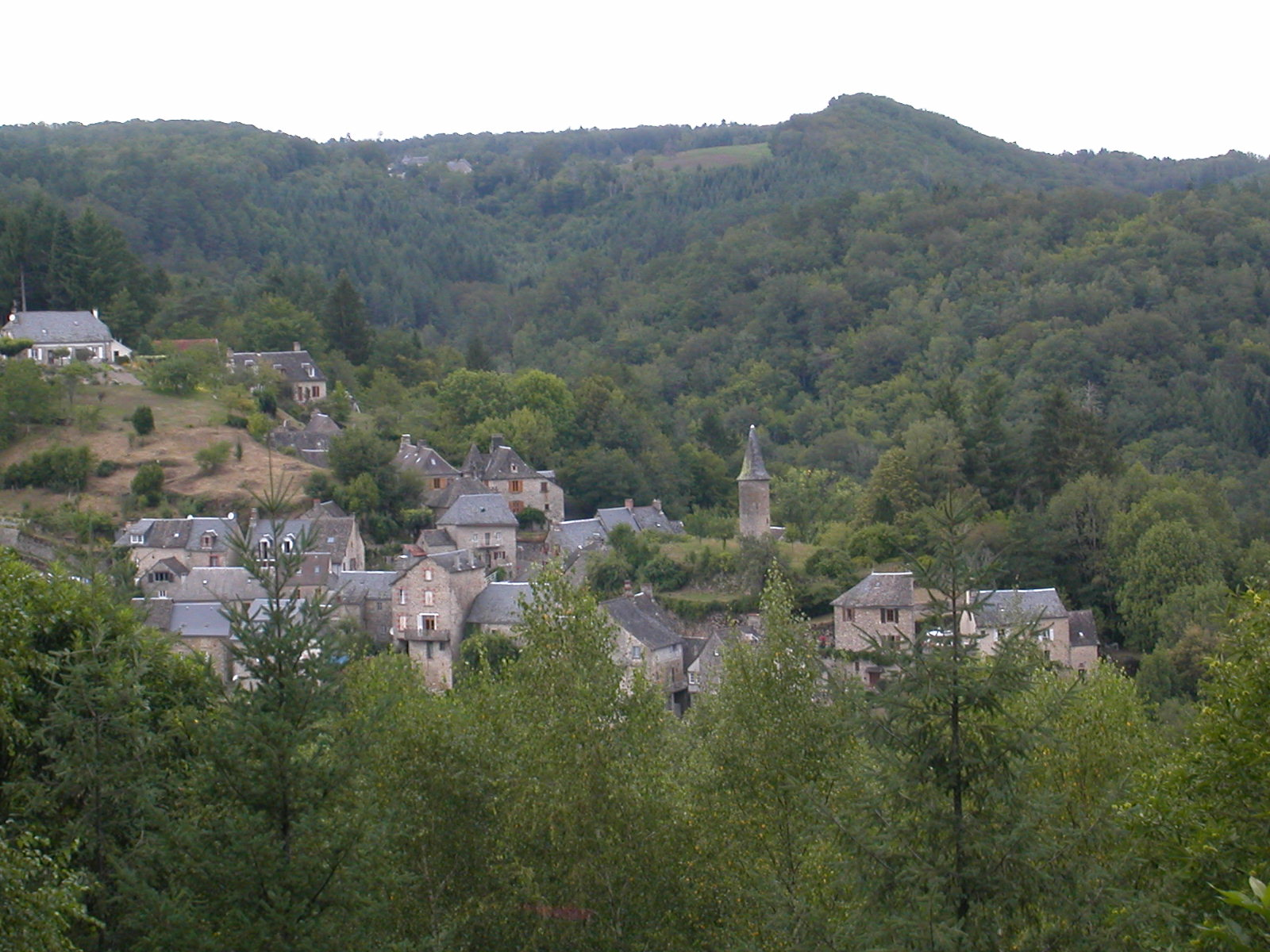
- A general view of La Roche-Canillac

- Coat of arms
- Location of La Roche-Canillac
- Location within France Location within Nouvelle-Aquitaine
- Coordinates: 45°11′46″N 1°58′10″E
- Country: France
- Region: Nouvelle-Aquitaine
- Department: Corrèze
- Arrondissement: Tulle
- Canton: Sainte-Fortunade
- Intercommunality: CA Tulle Agglo

Government
  - Mayor (2020–2026): Patrick Leresteux
- Area^{1}: 3.02 km^{2} (1.17 sq mi)
- Elevation: 450 m (1,480 ft)
- Highest elevation: 523 m (1,716 ft)
- Lowest elevation: 280 m (920 ft)
- Population (2023): 126
  - Density: 41.7/km^{2} (108/sq mi)
- Time zone: UTC+01:00 (CET)
  - Summer (DST): UTC+02:00 (CEST)
- INSEE/Postal code: 19174 /19320
- ^{1} French Land Register data, which excludes lakes, ponds, glaciers > 1 km^{2} (0.386 sq mi or 247 acres) and river estuaries.

La Roche-Canillac (French pronunciation: [la ʁɔʃ kanijak]; Occitan: La Ròcha Canilhac) is a commune in the Corrèze department in central France.

== Population ==
Historical population
Year	Pop.	±% p.a.
1968	282	—
1975	214	−3.87%
1982	185	−2.06%
1990	186	+0.07%
1999	164	−1.39%
2007	182	+1.31%
2012	151	−3.67%
2017	142	−1.22%
2023	126	−1.97%
Source: INSEE

== See also ==
- Communes of the Corrèze department
