= Eyrein =

- Commune
- Coat of arms
- Location of Eyrein
- Location within France Location within Nouvelle-Aquitaine
- Coordinates: 45°20′09″N 1°56′42″E
- Country: France
- Region: Nouvelle-Aquitaine
- Department: Corrèze
- Arrondissement: Tulle
- Canton: Sainte-Fortunade
- Intercommunality: CA Tulle Agglo

Government
  - Mayor (2024–2026): Marie-Pierre Le Mignon
- Area^{1}: 26.39 km^{2} (10.19 sq mi)
- Elevation: 552 m (1,811 ft)
- Highest elevation: 639 m (2,096 ft)
- Lowest elevation: 523 m (1,716 ft)
- Population (2023): 514
  - Density: 19.5/km^{2} (50.4/sq mi)
- Time zone: UTC+01:00 (CET)
  - Summer (DST): UTC+02:00 (CEST)
- INSEE/Postal code: 19081 /19800
- ^{1} French Land Register data, which excludes lakes, ponds, glaciers > 1 km^{2} (0.386 sq mi or 247 acres) and river estuaries.

Eyrein (French pronunciation: [eʁɛ̃]; Occitan: Airent) is a commune in the Corrèze department in central France.

== Population ==
Historical population
Year	Pop.	±% p.a.
1968	642	—
1975	602	−0.91%
1982	559	−1.05%
1990	513	−1.07%
1999	482	−0.69%
2007	515	+0.83%
2012	512	−0.12%
2017	500	−0.47%
2023	514	+0.46%
Source: INSEE

== See also ==
- Communes of the Corrèze department
