= Saint-Martin-la-Méanne =

- Commune
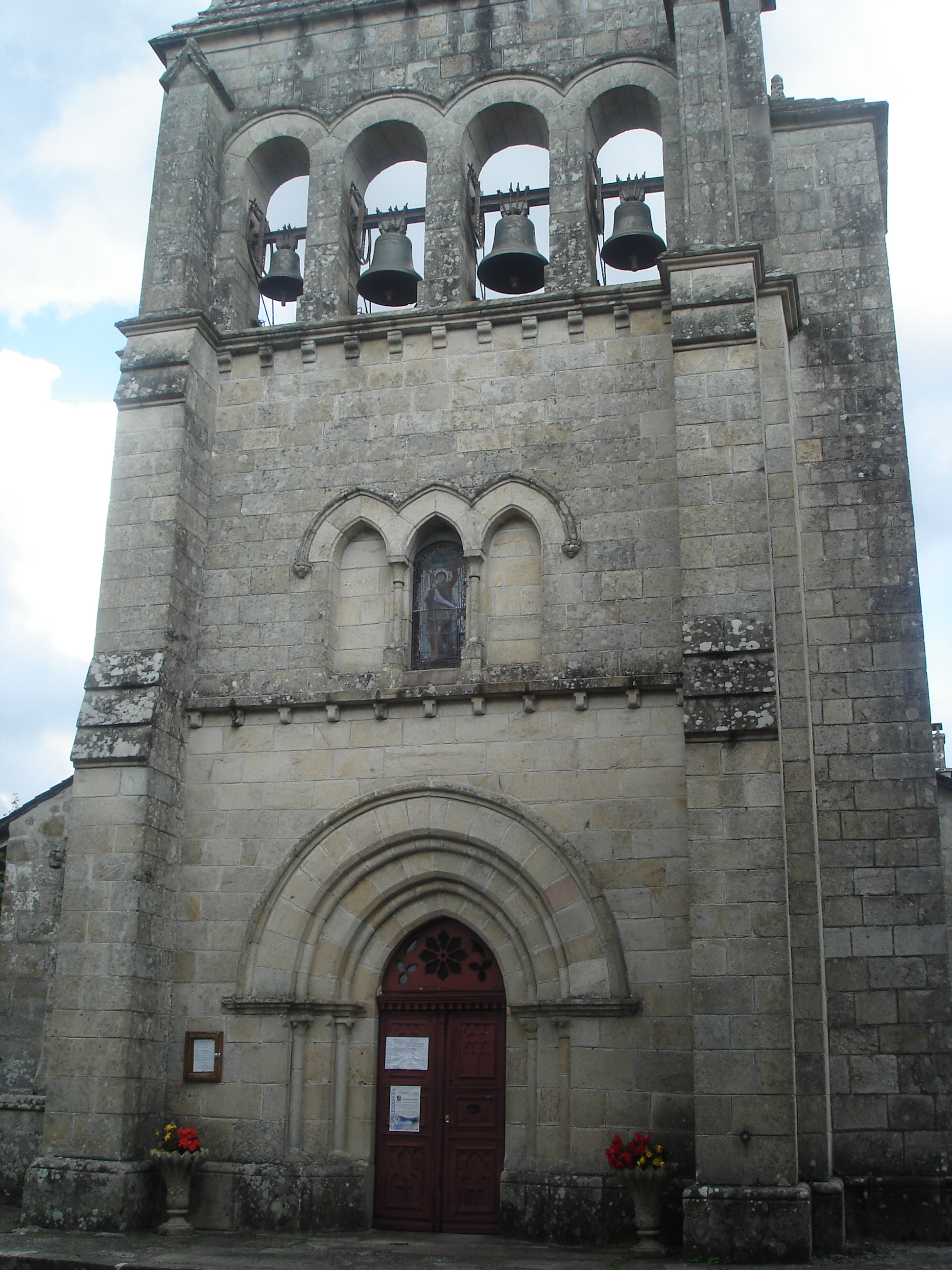
- The church in Saint-Martin-la-Méanne

- Coat of arms
- Location of Saint-Martin-la-Méanne
- Location within France Location within Nouvelle-Aquitaine
- Coordinates: 45°10′14″N 1°59′15″E
- Country: France
- Region: Nouvelle-Aquitaine
- Department: Corrèze
- Arrondissement: Tulle
- Canton: Sainte-Fortunade

Government
  - Mayor (2020–2026): Christian Pair
- Area^{1}: 27.7 km^{2} (10.7 sq mi)
- Elevation: 500 m (1,600 ft)
- Highest elevation: 548 m (1,798 ft)
- Lowest elevation: 195 m (640 ft)
- Population (2023): 351
  - Density: 12.7/km^{2} (32.8/sq mi)
- Time zone: UTC+01:00 (CET)
  - Summer (DST): UTC+02:00 (CEST)
- INSEE/Postal code: 19222 /19320
- ^{1} French Land Register data, which excludes lakes, ponds, glaciers > 1 km^{2} (0.386 sq mi or 247 acres) and river estuaries.

Saint-Martin-la-Méanne (French pronunciation: [sɛ̃ maʁtɛ̃ la mean]; Limousin: Sent Martin la Mediana) is a commune in the Corrèze department in central France.

== Population ==
Historical population
| Year | Pop. | ±% p.a. |
|---|---|---|
| 1968 | 532 | — |
| 1975 | 458 | −2.12% |
| 1982 | 393 | −2.16% |
| 1990 | 362 | −1.02% |
| 1999 | 365 | +0.09% |
| 2007 | 361 | −0.14% |
| 2012 | 354 | −0.39% |
| 2017 | 340 | −0.80% |
| 2023 | 351 | +0.53% |
Source: INSEE

== See also ==
- Communes of the Corrèze department
