= Clergoux =

- Commune
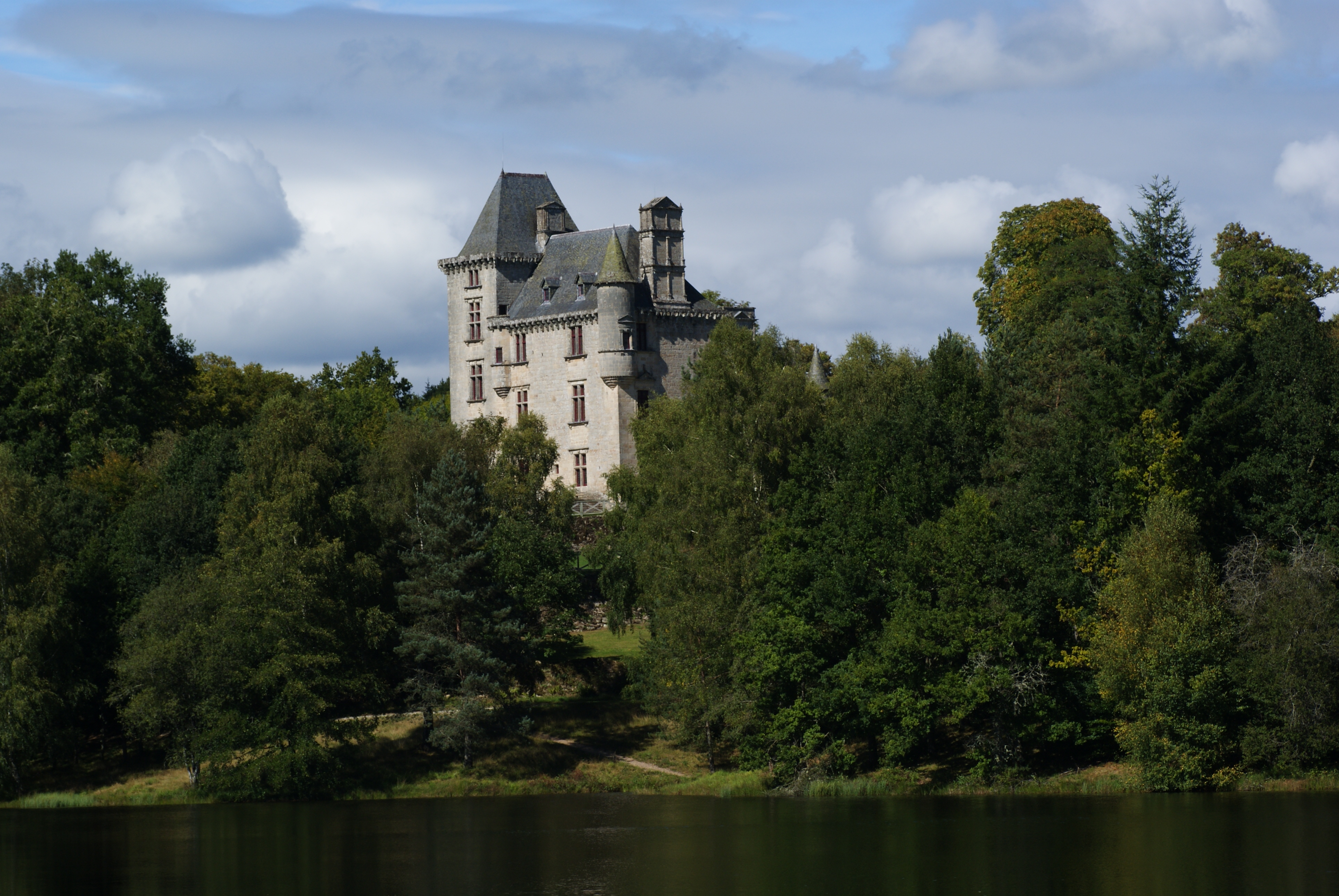
- Chateau of Sédières

- Coat of arms
- Location of Clergoux
- Location within France Location within Nouvelle-Aquitaine
- Coordinates: 45°16′46″N 1°58′24″E
- Country: France
- Region: Nouvelle-Aquitaine
- Department: Corrèze
- Arrondissement: Tulle
- Canton: Sainte-Fortunade
- Intercommunality: CA Tulle Agglo

Government
  - Mayor (2026–2032): Catherine Donnedevie
- Area^{1}: 16.11 km^{2} (6.22 sq mi)
- Elevation: 540 m (1,770 ft)
- Highest elevation: 603 m (1,978 ft)
- Lowest elevation: 511 m (1,677 ft)
- Population (2023): 408
  - Density: 25.3/km^{2} (65.6/sq mi)
- Time zone: UTC+01:00 (CET)
  - Summer (DST): UTC+02:00 (CEST)
- INSEE/Postal code: 19056 /19320
- ^{1} French Land Register data, which excludes lakes, ponds, glaciers > 1 km^{2} (0.386 sq mi or 247 acres) and river estuaries.

Clergoux (French pronunciation: [klɛʁɡu]; Occitan: Clergós) is a commune in the Corrèze department in central France.

== Population ==
Historical population
Year	Pop.	±% p.a.
1968	430	—
1975	397	−1.13%
1982	390	−0.25%
1990	367	−0.76%
1999	385	+0.53%
2007	370	−0.50%
2012	388	+0.95%
2017	412	+1.21%
2023	408	−0.16%
Source: INSEE

== See also ==
- Communes of the Corrèze department
