= Communauté d'agglomération Tulle Agglo =

Tulle Agglo
- Communauté d'agglomération
- Interactive map of Tulle Agglo
- Coordinates: 45°18′N 01°48′E
- Country: France
- Region: Nouvelle-Aquitaine
- Department: Corrèze
- No. of communes: {{{nbcomm}}}
- Established: 1993
- Area: 868.1 km^{2} (335.2 sq mi)
- Population (2019): 44,658
  - Density: 51.44/km^{2} (133.2/sq mi)
- Website: www.tulleagglo.fr

Communauté d'agglomération Tulle Agglo is the communauté d'agglomération, an intercommunal structure, centred on the town of Tulle. It is located in the Corrèze department, in the Nouvelle-Aquitaine region, central France. Created in 1993, its seat is in Tulle. Its area is 868.1 km^{2}. Its population was 44,658 in 2019, of which 14,812 in Tulle proper.

== Composition ==
The communauté d'agglomération consists of the following 43 communes:

1. Les Angles-sur-Corrèze
2. Bar
3. Beaumont
4. Chamboulive
5. Chameyrat
6. Champagnac-la-Prune
7. Chanac-les-Mines
8. Chanteix
9. Le Chastang
10. Clergoux
11. Cornil
12. Corrèze
13. Espagnac
14. Eyrein
15. Favars
16. Gimel-les-Cascades
17. Gros-Chastang
18. Gumond
19. Ladignac-sur-Rondelles
20. Lagarde-Marc-la-Tour
21. Lagraulière
22. Laguenne-sur-Avalouze
23. Le Lonzac
24. Naves
25. Orliac-de-Bar
26. Pandrignes
27. Pierrefitte
28. La Roche-Canillac
29. Saint-Augustin
30. Saint-Clément
31. Sainte-Fortunade
32. Saint-Germain-les-Vergnes
33. Saint-Hilaire-Peyroux
34. Saint-Jal
35. Saint-Martial-de-Gimel
36. Saint-Mexant
37. Saint-Pardoux-la-Croisille
38. Saint-Paul
39. Saint-Priest-de-Gimel
40. Saint-Salvadour
41. Seilhac
42. Tulle
43. Vitrac-sur-Montane
