= Gimel-les-Cascades =

- Commune
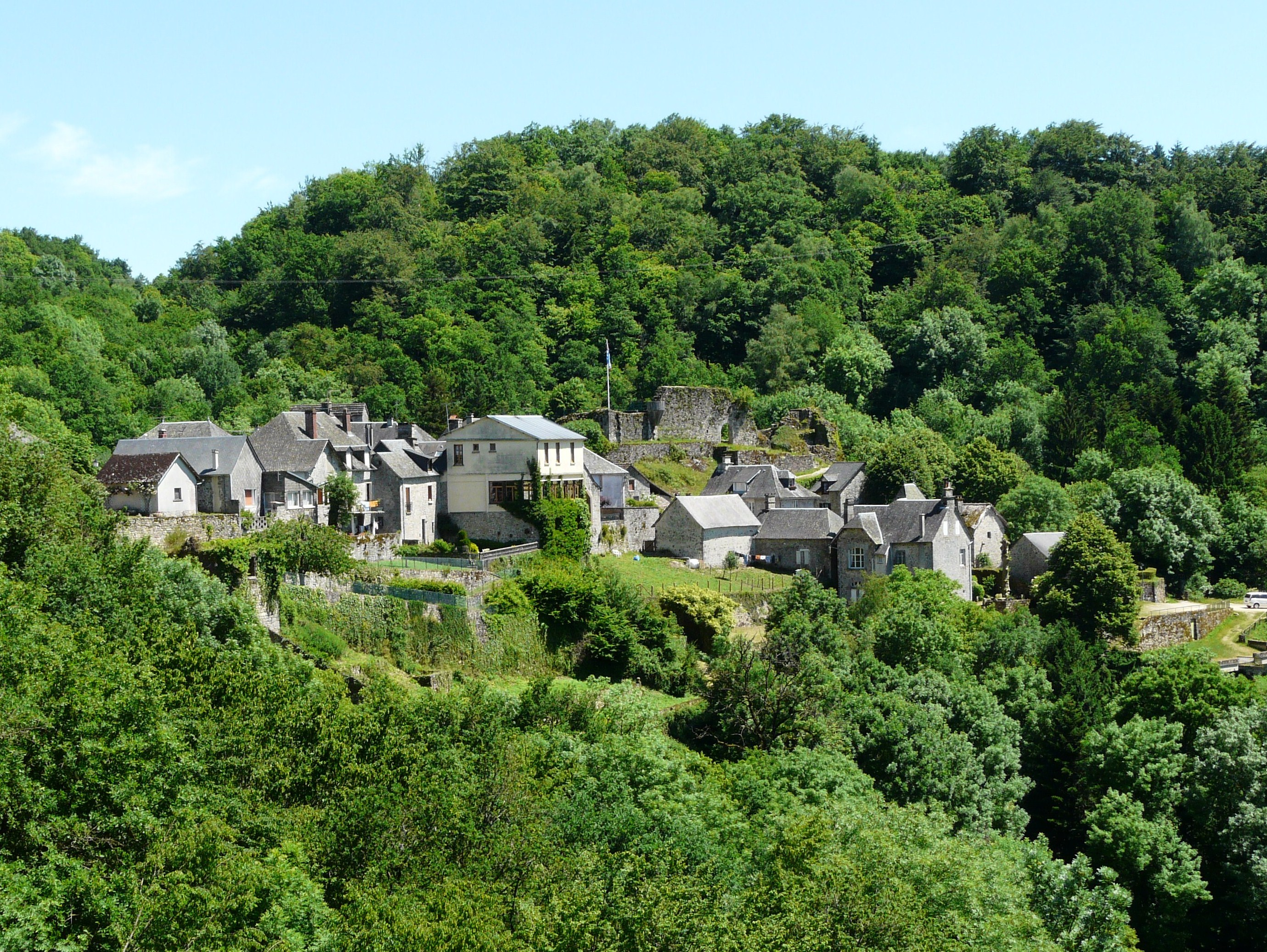
- A general view of Gimel-les-Cascades

- Coat of arms
- Location of Gimel-les-Cascades
- Location within France Location within Nouvelle-Aquitaine
- Coordinates: 45°18′01″N 1°51′05″E
- Country: France
- Region: Nouvelle-Aquitaine
- Department: Corrèze
- Arrondissement: Tulle
- Canton: Naves
- Intercommunality: CA Tulle Agglo

Government
  - Mayor (2020–2026): Alain Sentier
- Area^{1}: 20.86 km^{2} (8.05 sq mi)
- Highest elevation: 606 m (1,988 ft)
- Lowest elevation: 220 m (720 ft)
- Population (2023): 755
  - Density: 36.2/km^{2} (93.7/sq mi)
- Time zone: UTC+01:00 (CET)
  - Summer (DST): UTC+02:00 (CEST)
- INSEE/Postal code: 19085 /19800
- ^{1} French Land Register data, which excludes lakes, ponds, glaciers > 1 km^{2} (0.386 sq mi or 247 acres) and river estuaries.

Gimel-les-Cascades (French pronunciation: [ʒimɛl le kaskad]; Occitan: Gimel) is a commune in the Corrèze department in central France.

== Geography ==
The A89 motorway and the departmental roads 1089, 53, 53E3, 53E4, 26, and 978 cross Gimel-les-Cascades. The village is located 7 km (4.35 mi) northeast of Tulle and 8 km (4.97 mi) south of Corrèze. The commune is located in the Massif Central and watered by the Montane which serves as its limit to the southwest separating it from Chanac-les-Mines.

== Population ==
Historical population
Year	Pop.	±% p.a.
1968	558	—
1975	494	−1.73%
1982	553	+1.62%
1990	655	+2.14%
1999	630	−0.43%
2007	700	+1.33%
2012	737	+1.04%
2017	794	+1.50%
2023	755	−0.84%
Source: INSEE

== See also ==
- Communes of the Corrèze department
