= Chanac-les-Mines =

- Commune
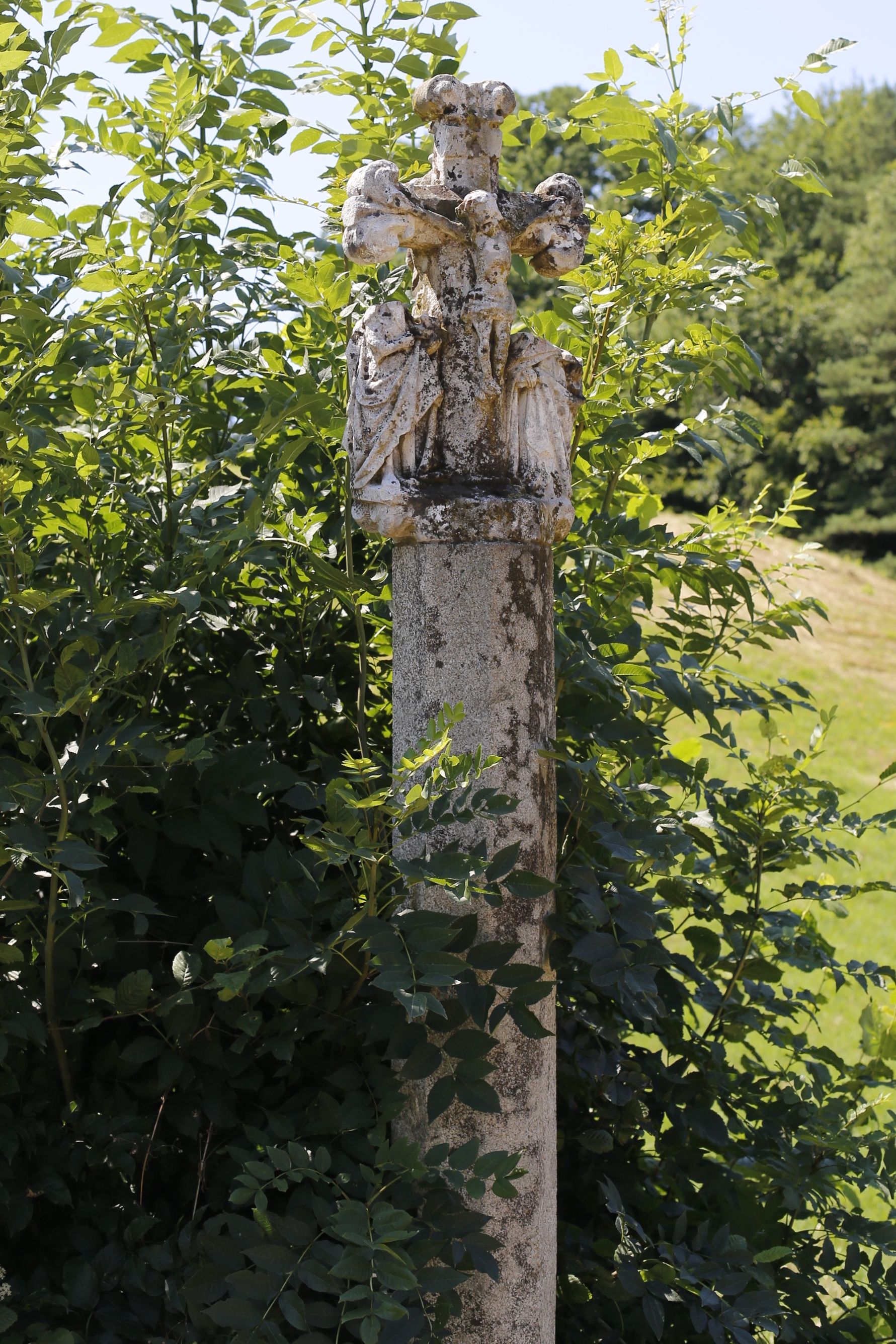
- The Malangle Cross

- Coat of arms
- Location of Chanac-les-Mines
- Location within France Location within Nouvelle-Aquitaine
- Coordinates: 45°15′55″N 1°49′14″E
- Country: France
- Region: Nouvelle-Aquitaine
- Department: Corrèze
- Arrondissement: Tulle
- Canton: Sainte-Fortunade
- Intercommunality: CA Tulle Agglo

Government
  - Mayor (2020–2026): Bernard Salles
- Area^{1}: 13.26 km^{2} (5.12 sq mi)
- Elevation: 325 m (1,066 ft)
- Highest elevation: 466 m (1,529 ft)
- Lowest elevation: 218 m (715 ft)
- Population (2023): 437
  - Density: 33.0/km^{2} (85.4/sq mi)
- Time zone: UTC+01:00 (CET)
  - Summer (DST): UTC+02:00 (CEST)
- INSEE/Postal code: 19041 /19150
- ^{1} French Land Register data, which excludes lakes, ponds, glaciers > 1 km^{2} (0.386 sq mi or 247 acres) and river estuaries.

Chanac-les-Mines (French pronunciation: [ʃanak le min]; Occitan: Chanac) is a commune in the Corrèze department in central France.

== Population ==
Historical population
Year	Pop.	±% p.a.
1968	291	—
1975	389	+4.23%
1982	511	+3.97%
1990	511	+0.00%
1999	482	−0.65%
2007	509	+0.68%
2012	493	−0.64%
2017	485	−0.33%
2023	437	−1.72%
Source: INSEE

== See also ==
- Communes of the Corrèze department
