= Canton of Sainte-Fortunade =

Coordinates: 45.21°N 1.77°E

The canton of Sainte-Fortunade is an administrative division of the Corrèze department, south-central France. It was created at the French canton reorganisation which came into effect in March 2015. Its seat is in Sainte-Fortunade.

It consists of the following communes:

1. Champagnac-la-Prune
2. Chanac-les-Mines
3. Le Chastang
4. Clergoux
5. Cornil
6. Espagnac
7. Eyrein
8. Gros-Chastang
9. Gumond
10. Ladignac-sur-Rondelles
11. Lagarde-Marc-la-Tour
12. Laguenne-sur-Avalouze
13. Pandrignes
14. La Roche-Canillac
15. Sainte-Fortunade
16. Saint-Martial-de-Gimel
17. Saint-Martin-la-Méanne
18. Saint-Pardoux-la-Croisille
19. Saint-Paul
20. Saint-Priest-de-Gimel
