= Mestes =

- Commune
- Coat of arms
- Location of Mestes
- Location within France Location within Nouvelle-Aquitaine
- Coordinates: 45°30′02″N 2°18′52″E
- Country: France
- Region: Nouvelle-Aquitaine
- Department: Corrèze
- Arrondissement: Ussel
- Canton: Haute-Dordogne
- Intercommunality: Haute-Corrèze Communauté

Government
  - Mayor (2026–2032): Aurélie Gibouret Lambert
- Area^{1}: 11.45 km^{2} (4.42 sq mi)
- Highest elevation: 686 m (2,251 ft)
- Lowest elevation: 545 m (1,788 ft)
- Population (2023): 341
  - Density: 29.8/km^{2} (77.1/sq mi)
- Time zone: UTC+01:00 (CET)
  - Summer (DST): UTC+02:00 (CEST)
- INSEE/Postal code: 19135 /19200
- ^{1} French Land Register data, which excludes lakes, ponds, glaciers > 1 km^{2} (0.386 sq mi or 247 acres) and river estuaries.

Mestes (French pronunciation: [mɛst]; Occitan: Mestas) is a commune in the Corrèze department in central France.

== Geography ==
Included in the urban area of Ussel, the commune of Mestes is located in the Massif Central, in the northeast of the Corrèze department. The river Diège forms all of the commune's eastern boundary, which separates it from Saint-Exupéry-les-Roches.

The minimum altitude, 545m, is located to the southeast, at the reservoir of the Barrage des Chaumettes, where the Diège leaves the commune to serve as the boundary between Chirac-Bellevue and Saint-Exupéry-les-Roches. Maximum altitude at 686 or 700 metres, is located to the northwest, between Valadier and La Serre.

A few kilometres from interchange no. 23 "Ussel-West" on the A89 autoroute, the commune's territory is served by departmental roads 120, 168, 979, and 982.

While the parish church is located in the hamlet of Mestes, off the main roads, the town hall is in the village of La Serre, where the four aforementioned departmental roads meet, six kilometers south of Ussel.

== Population ==
Historical population
| Year | Pop. | ±% p.a. |
|---|---|---|
| 1968 | 216 | — |
| 1975 | 202 | −0.95% |
| 1982 | 204 | +0.14% |
| 1990 | 263 | +3.23% |
| 1999 | 262 | −0.04% |
| 2007 | 296 | +1.54% |
| 2012 | 365 | +4.28% |
| 2017 | 355 | −0.55% |
| 2023 | 341 | −0.67% |
Source: INSEE

== Places and monuments ==
- L'église Saint-Pierre - partly Romanesque, was built in 13th-century and then enlarged in 17th-century adding two chapels. Inside, you can discover a depiction of Christ's Déploration du Christ, a 17th-century wooden painting, depicting the entombment of Christ, has been listed as a historic monument since 1970.
- At the municipal border with Chirac-Bellevue is a former Transcorrézien station, where a classified crane car is displayed.

== See also ==
- Communes of the Corrèze department
