= Saint-Étienne-la-Geneste =

- Commune
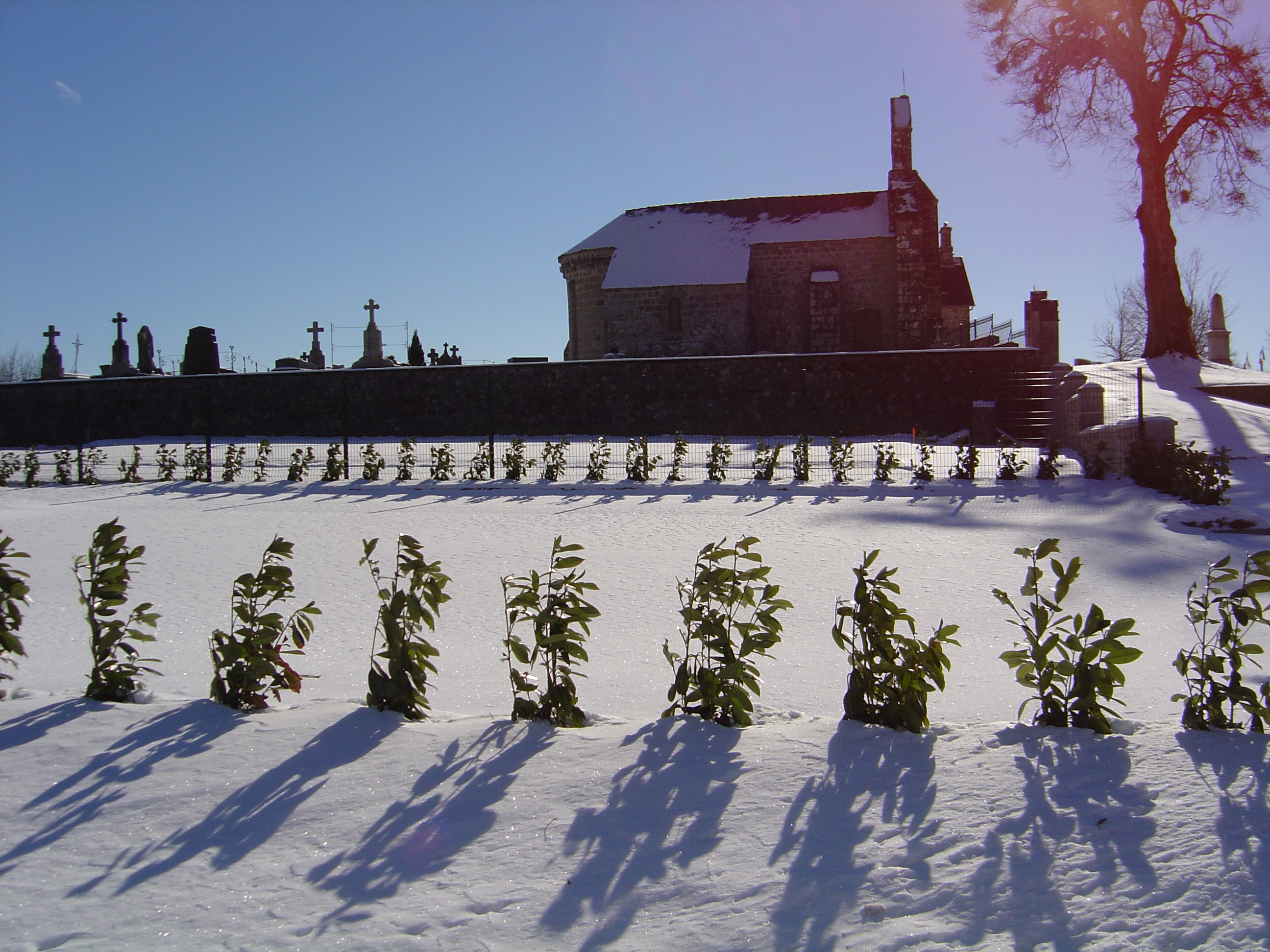
- The church in Saint-Étienne-la-Geneste

- Coat of arms
- Location of Saint-Étienne-la-Geneste
- Location within France Location within Nouvelle-Aquitaine
- Coordinates: 45°26′50″N 2°20′47″E
- Country: France
- Region: Nouvelle-Aquitaine
- Department: Corrèze
- Arrondissement: Ussel
- Canton: Haute-Dordogne
- Intercommunality: Haute-Corrèze Communauté

Government
  - Mayor (2020–2026): Christophe Tur
- Area^{1}: 5.01 km^{2} (1.93 sq mi)
- Elevation: 680 m (2,230 ft)
- Highest elevation: 637 m (2,090 ft)
- Lowest elevation: 545 m (1,788 ft)
- Population (2023): 87
  - Density: 17/km^{2} (45/sq mi)
- Time zone: UTC+01:00 (CET)
  - Summer (DST): UTC+02:00 (CEST)
- INSEE/Postal code: 19200 /19160
- ^{1} French Land Register data, which excludes lakes, ponds, glaciers > 1 km^{2} (0.386 sq mi or 247 acres) and river estuaries.

Saint-Étienne-la-Geneste is a commune in the Corrèze department in central France.

== Geography ==
The river Diège forms all of the commune's eastern boundary.

== Population ==
Historical population
Year	Pop.	±% p.a.
1968	85	—
1975	58	−5.31%
1982	55	−0.76%
1990	62	+1.51%
1999	61	−0.18%
2007	75	+2.62%
2012	96	+5.06%
2017	93	−0.63%
2023	87	−1.11%
Source: INSEE

== See also ==
- Communes of the Corrèze department
