= Bort-les-Orgues =

- Commune
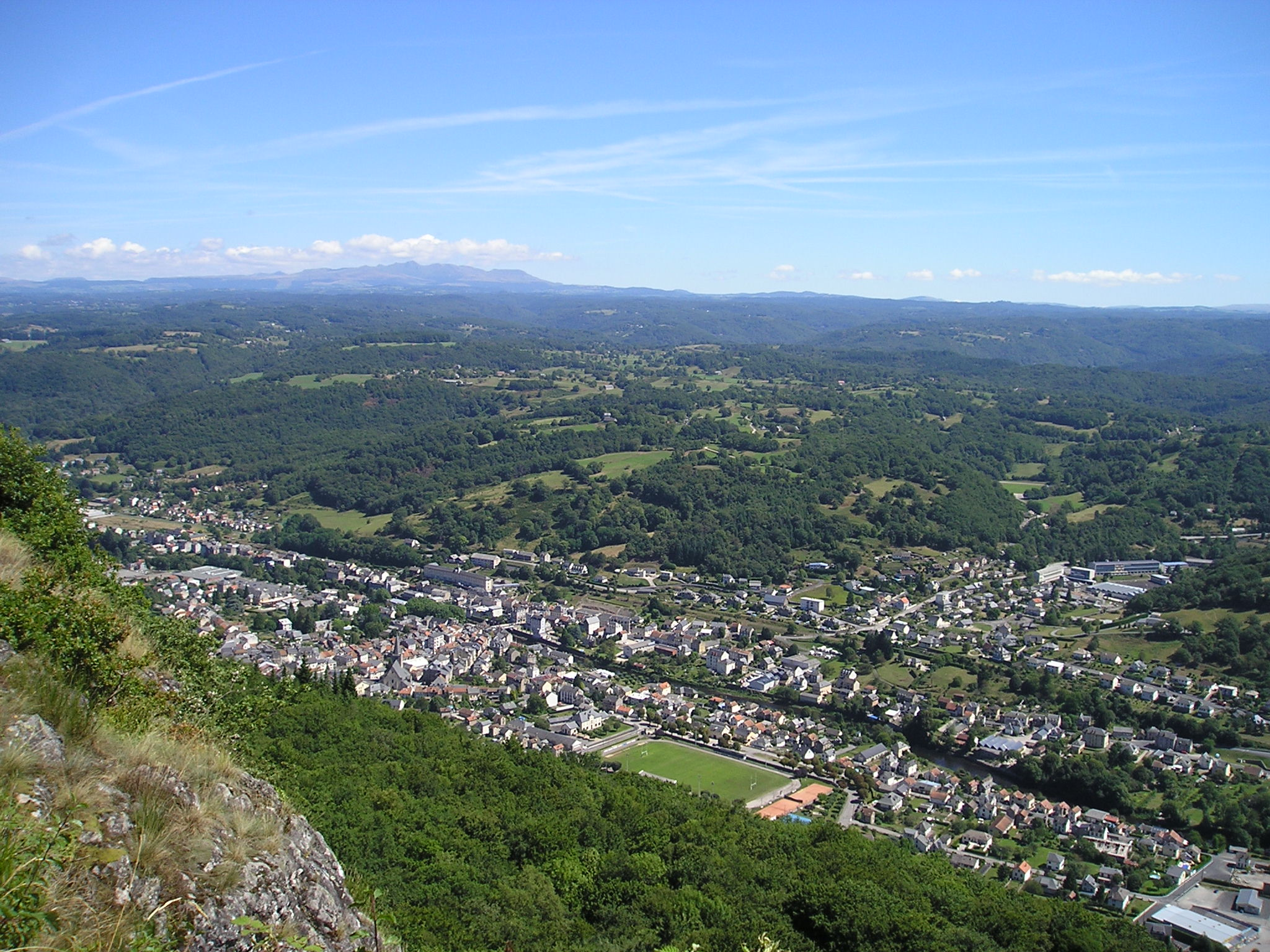
- General view from les Orgues.

- Coat of arms
- Location of Bort-les-Orgues
- Location within France Location within Nouvelle-Aquitaine
- Coordinates: 45°24′03″N 2°29′57″E
- Country: France
- Region: Nouvelle-Aquitaine
- Department: Corrèze
- Arrondissement: Ussel
- Canton: Haute-Dordogne
- Intercommunality: Haute-Corrèze Communauté

Government
  - Mayor (2020–2026): Éric Ziolo
- Area^{1}: 15.07 km^{2} (5.82 sq mi)
- Elevation: 437 m (1,434 ft)
- Highest elevation: 788 m (2,585 ft)
- Lowest elevation: 403 m (1,322 ft)
- Population (2023): 2,483
  - Density: 164.8/km^{2} (426.7/sq mi)
- Time zone: UTC+01:00 (CET)
  - Summer (DST): UTC+02:00 (CEST)
- INSEE/Postal code: 19028 /19110
- ^{1} French Land Register data, which excludes lakes, ponds, glaciers > 1 km^{2} (0.386 sq mi or 247 acres) and river estuaries.

Bort-les-Orgues (French pronunciation: [bɔʁ le.z‿ɔʁɡ]; Occitan: Bòrt lo Organs) is a commune in the south-central French department of Corrèze.

== Geography ==
Bort-les-Orgues is situated on the Dordogne.

The southern boundary of the commune is formed by the rivers Rhue and Dordogne. About 3 km east of the confluence of these rivers, the Rhue has carved a small gorge at a site known as the "Saut de la Saule". Bort-les-Orgues takes its name from les Orgues, a 2-km-long cliff of volcanic columnar basalt 80m to 100m high, at the foot of which it lies.

== Population ==
Historical population
Year	Pop.	±% p.a.
1968	4,937	—
1975	5,075	+0.39%
1982	4,509	−1.68%
1990	4,208	−0.86%
1999	3,534	−1.92%
2007	3,247	−1.05%
2012	2,866	−2.47%
2017	2,677	−1.36%
2023	2,483	−1.25%
Source: INSEE

== Personalities ==
- Bort-les-Orgues was the birthplace of the philosopher Jean-François Marmontel (1723–1799).
- Lina Margy (1914–1973), the famous French singer of the Le Petit Vin blanc, was born in Rue de Piechecros, in Bort-les-Orgues.
- Pierre Tornade (21 January 1930 – 7 March 2012) was a French actor. He appeared in 128 films and television shows between 1956 and 1998.
