= Veyrières, Corrèze =

Veyrières
- Commune
- Coat of arms
- Location of Veyrières
- Location within France Location within Nouvelle-Aquitaine
- Coordinates: 45°29′28″N 2°23′38″E
- Country: France
- Region: Nouvelle-Aquitaine
- Department: Corrèze
- Arrondissement: Ussel
- Canton: Haute-Dordogne
- Intercommunality: Haute-Corrèze Communauté

Government
  - Mayor (2020–2026): Laurent Sarfati
- Area^{1}: 4.1 km^{2} (1.6 sq mi)
- Highest elevation: 722 m (2,369 ft)
- Lowest elevation: 595 m (1,952 ft)
- Population (2023): 83
  - Density: 20/km^{2} (52/sq mi)
- Time zone: UTC+01:00 (CET)
  - Summer (DST): UTC+02:00 (CEST)
- INSEE/Postal code: 19283 /19200
- ^{1} French Land Register data, which excludes lakes, ponds, glaciers > 1 km^{2} (0.386 sq mi or 247 acres) and river estuaries.

Veyrières (French pronunciation: [veʁjɛʁ]; Occitan: Veirièras) is a commune in the Corrèze department in central France.

== Population ==
Historical population
Year	Pop.	±% p.a.
1968	89	—
1975	86	−0.49%
1982	69	−3.10%
1990	71	+0.36%
1999	66	−0.81%
2007	57	−1.82%
2012	72	+4.78%
2017	73	+0.28%
2023	83	+2.16%
Source: INSEE

== See also ==
- Communes of the Corrèze department
