= Saint-Oradoux-de-Chirouze =

Commune in Nouvelle-Aquitaine, France

- Commune
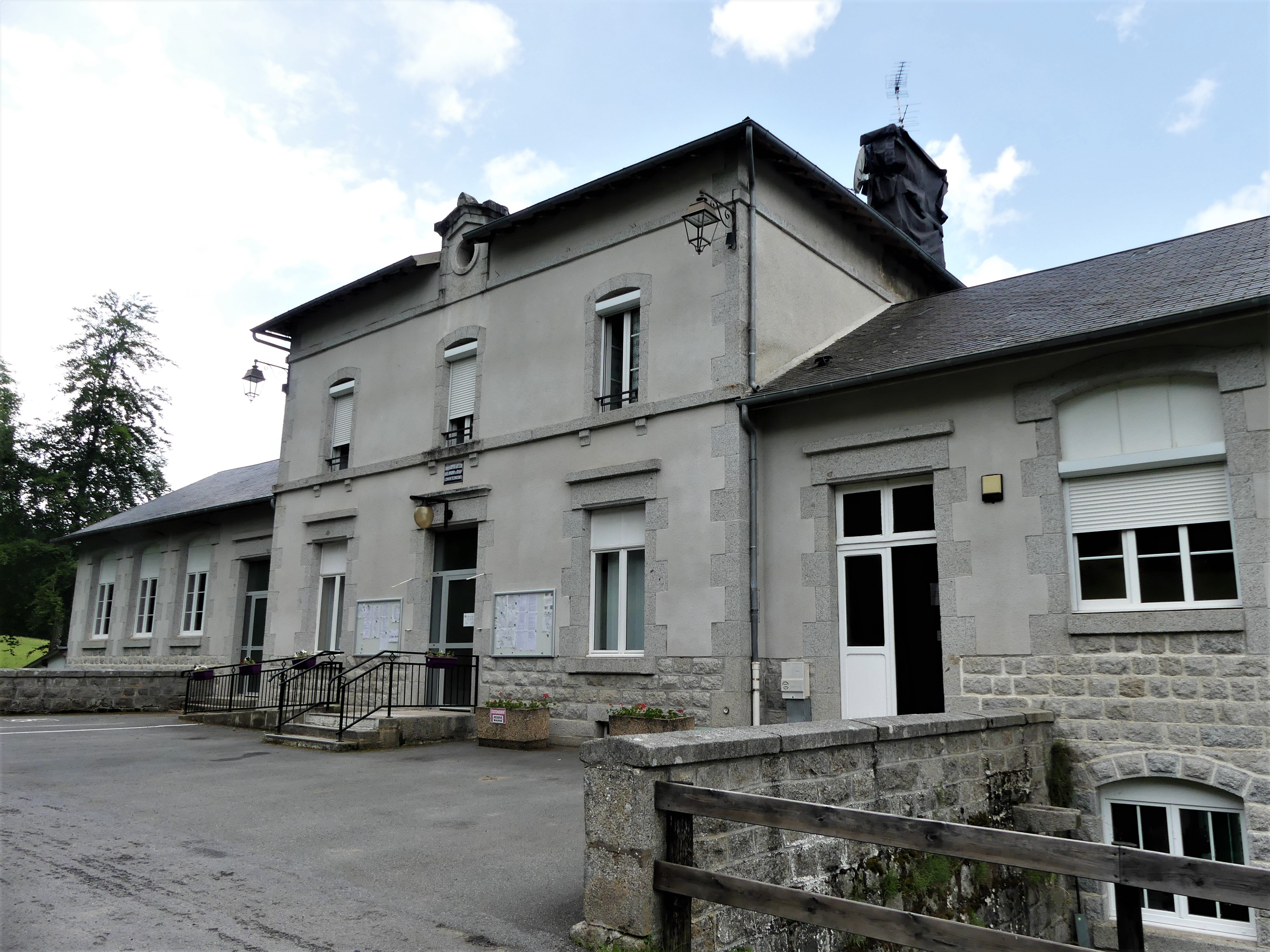
- Town hall

- Coat of arms
- Location of Saint-Oradoux-de-Chirouze
- Location within France Location within Nouvelle-Aquitaine
- Coordinates: 45°44′03″N 2°20′01″E
- Country: France
- Region: Nouvelle-Aquitaine
- Department: Creuse
- Arrondissement: Aubusson
- Canton: Auzances
- Intercommunality: Haute-Corrèze Communauté

Government
  - Mayor (2020–2026): Henri Granet
- Area^{1}: 28.58 km^{2} (11.03 sq mi)
- Elevation: 800 m (2,600 ft)
- Highest elevation: 936 m (3,071 ft)
- Lowest elevation: 753 m (2,470 ft)
- Population (2023): 71
  - Density: 2.5/km^{2} (6.4/sq mi)
- Time zone: UTC+01:00 (CET)
  - Summer (DST): UTC+02:00 (CEST)
- INSEE/Postal code: 23224 /23100
- ^{1} French Land Register data, which excludes lakes, ponds, glaciers > 1 km^{2} (0.386 sq mi or 247 acres) and river estuaries.

Saint-Oradoux-de-Chirouze (French pronunciation: [sɛ̃.t‿ɔʁadu də ʃiʁuz]; Occitan: Sent Orador de Chirosa) is a commune in the Creuse department in central France.

== Population ==
Historical population
Year	Pop.	±% p.a.
1968	116	—
1975	71	−6.77%
1982	65	−1.25%
1990	55	−2.07%
1999	74	+3.35%
2007	84	+1.60%
2012	84	+0.00%
2017	68	−4.14%
2023	71	+0.72%
Source: INSEE

== See also ==
- Communes of the Creuse department
