= Canton of Haute-Dordogne =

Coordinates: 45.40°N 2.50°E

The canton of Haute-Dordogne is an administrative division of the Corrèze department, south-central France. It was created at the French canton reorganisation which came into effect in March 2015. Its seat is in Bort-les-Orgues.

It consists of the following communes:

1. Bort-les-Orgues
2. Chirac-Bellevue
3. Confolent-Port-Dieu
4. Lamazière-Basse
5. Latronche
6. Liginiac
7. Margerides
8. Mestes
9. Monestier-Port-Dieu
10. Neuvic
11. Palisse
12. Roche-le-Peyroux
13. Saint-Bonnet-près-Bort
14. Sainte-Marie-Lapanouze
15. Saint-Étienne-aux-Clos
16. Saint-Étienne-la-Geneste
17. Saint-Exupéry-les-Roches
18. Saint-Fréjoux
19. Saint-Hilaire-Luc
20. Saint-Pantaléon-de-Lapleau
21. Saint-Victour
22. Sarroux-Saint Julien
23. Sérandon
24. Thalamy
25. Valiergues
26. Veyrières
