= Saint-Victour =

- Commune
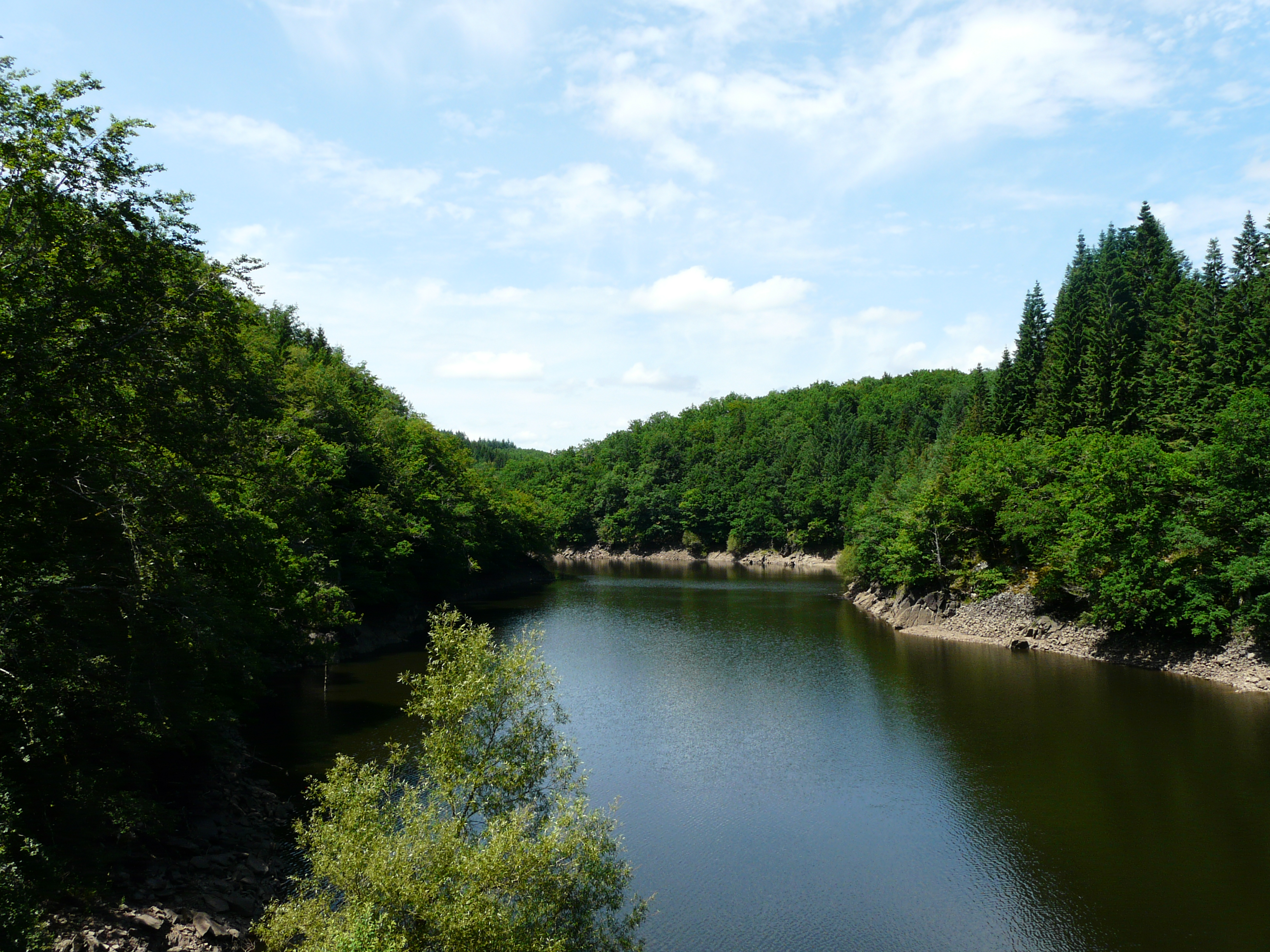
- The Diège dam, upstream of Chaumettes

- Coat of arms
- Location of Saint-Victour
- Location within France Location within Nouvelle-Aquitaine
- Coordinates: 45°27′55″N 2°22′51″E
- Country: France
- Region: Nouvelle-Aquitaine
- Department: Corrèze
- Arrondissement: Ussel
- Canton: Haute-Dordogne
- Intercommunality: Haute-Corrèze Communauté

Government
  - Mayor (2023–2026): Audrey Beynat
- Area^{1}: 14.79 km^{2} (5.71 sq mi)
- Elevation: 550 m (1,800 ft)
- Highest elevation: 737 m (2,418 ft)
- Lowest elevation: 513 m (1,683 ft)
- Population (2023): 199
  - Density: 13.5/km^{2} (34.8/sq mi)
- Time zone: UTC+01:00 (CET)
  - Summer (DST): UTC+02:00 (CEST)
- INSEE/Postal code: 19247 /19200
- ^{1} French Land Register data, which excludes lakes, ponds, glaciers > 1 km^{2} (0.386 sq mi or 247 acres) and river estuaries.

Saint-Victour (French pronunciation: [sɛ̃ viktuʁ]; Occitan: Sent Victor) is a commune in the Corrèze department in central France.

== Geography ==
The river Diège forms all of the commune's western and southwestern boundaries.

== Population ==
Historical population
Year	Pop.	±% p.a.
1968	261	—
1975	211	−2.99%
1982	183	−2.01%
1990	142	−3.12%
1999	171	+2.09%
2007	172	+0.07%
2012	188	+1.79%
2017	186	−0.21%
2023	199	+1.13%
Source: INSEE

== See also ==
- Communes of the Corrèze department
