= Margerides =

- Commune
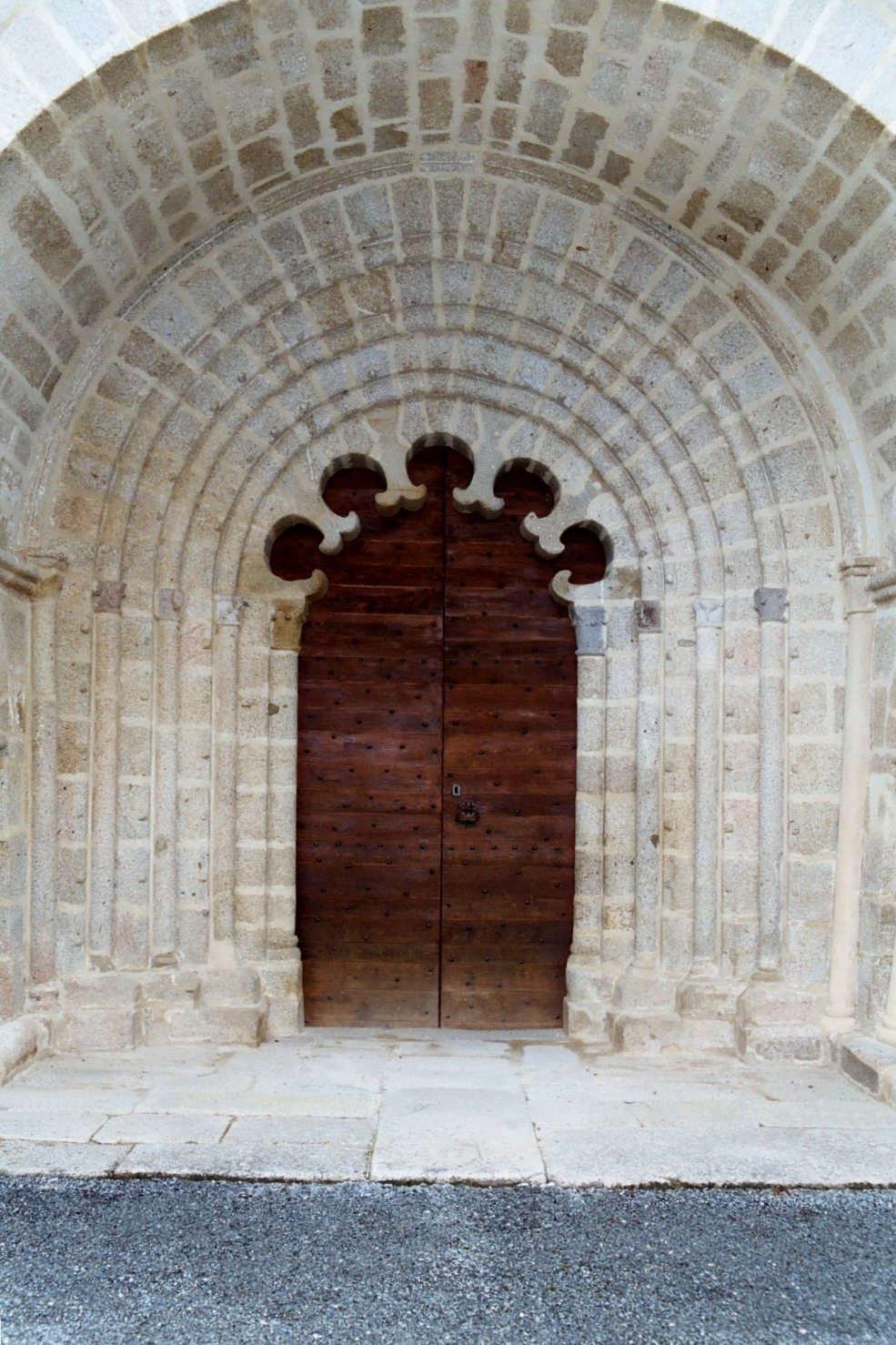
- Church door

- Coat of arms
- Location of Margerides
- Location within France Location within Nouvelle-Aquitaine
- Coordinates: 45°27′13″N 2°23′58″E
- Country: France
- Region: Nouvelle-Aquitaine
- Department: Corrèze
- Arrondissement: Ussel
- Canton: Haute-Dordogne
- Intercommunality: Haute-Corrèze Communauté

Government
  - Mayor (2020–2026): Danielle Coulaud
- Area^{1}: 11.65 km^{2} (4.50 sq mi)
- Population (2023): 271
  - Density: 23.3/km^{2} (60.2/sq mi)
- Time zone: UTC+01:00 (CET)
  - Summer (DST): UTC+02:00 (CEST)
- INSEE/Postal code: 19128 /19200
- ^{1} French Land Register data, which excludes lakes, ponds, glaciers > 1 km^{2} (0.386 sq mi or 247 acres) and river estuaries.

Margerides (French pronunciation: [maʁʒəʁid]; Occitan: Marjarida) is a commune in the Corrèze department in central France.

== Geography ==
The river Diège forms all of the commune's western boundary.

== Population ==
Historical population
Year	Pop.	±% p.a.
1968	281	—
1975	246	−1.88%
1982	240	−0.35%
1990	233	−0.37%
1999	225	−0.39%
2007	250	+1.33%
2012	277	+2.07%
2017	305	+1.94%
2023	271	−1.95%
Source: INSEE

== See also ==
- Communes of the Corrèze department
