= Roche-le-Peyroux =

- Commune
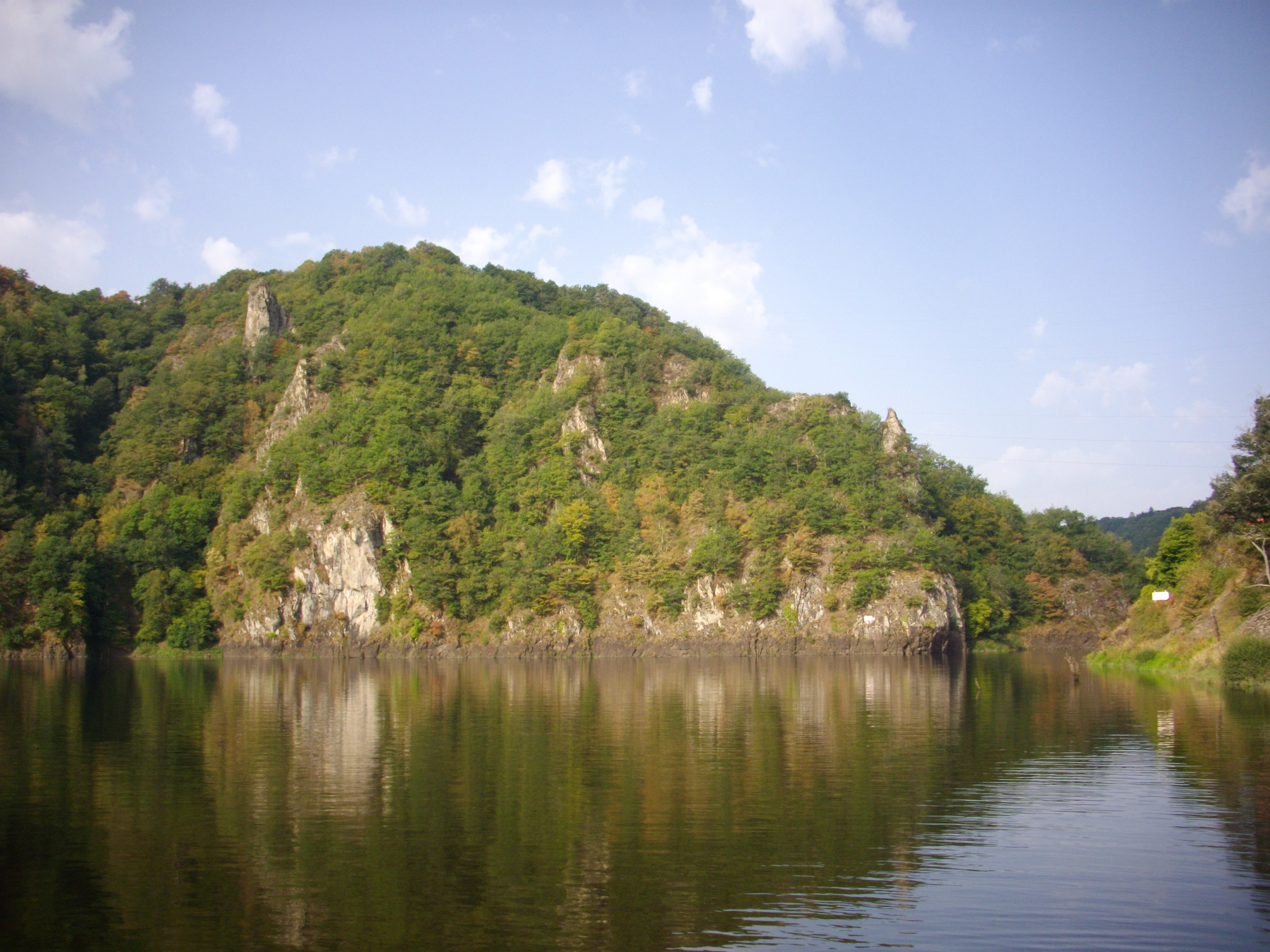
- Confluence of the Diège and the Dordogne

- Coat of arms
- Location of Roche-le-Peyroux
- Location within France Location within Nouvelle-Aquitaine
- Coordinates: 45°25′24″N 2°22′54″E
- Country: France
- Region: Nouvelle-Aquitaine
- Department: Corrèze
- Arrondissement: Ussel
- Canton: Haute-Dordogne
- Intercommunality: Haute-Corrèze Communauté

Government
  - Mayor (2020–2026): Monique Jabiol
- Area^{1}: 7.15 km^{2} (2.76 sq mi)
- Highest elevation: 657 m (2,156 ft)
- Lowest elevation: 400 m (1,300 ft)
- Population (2023): 107
  - Density: 15.0/km^{2} (38.8/sq mi)
- Time zone: UTC+01:00 (CET)
  - Summer (DST): UTC+02:00 (CEST)
- INSEE/Postal code: 19175 /19160
- ^{1} French Land Register data, which excludes lakes, ponds, glaciers > 1 km^{2} (0.386 sq mi or 247 acres) and river estuaries.

Roche-le-Peyroux (French pronunciation: [ʁɔʃ lə peʁu]; Occitan: Ròcha d'a Peirós) is a commune in the Corrèze department in central France.

== Geography ==
The river Diège forms all of the commune's northern and eastern boundaries, then flows into the Dordogne, which forms all of its southern boundary.

== Population ==
Historical population
Year	Pop.	±% p.a.
1968	124	—
1975	77	−6.58%
1982	93	+2.73%
1990	79	−2.02%
1999	84	+0.68%
2007	85	+0.15%
2012	91	+1.37%
2017	96	+1.08%
2023	107	+1.82%
Source: INSEE

== See also ==
- Communes of the Corrèze department
