= Saint-Setiers =

- Commune
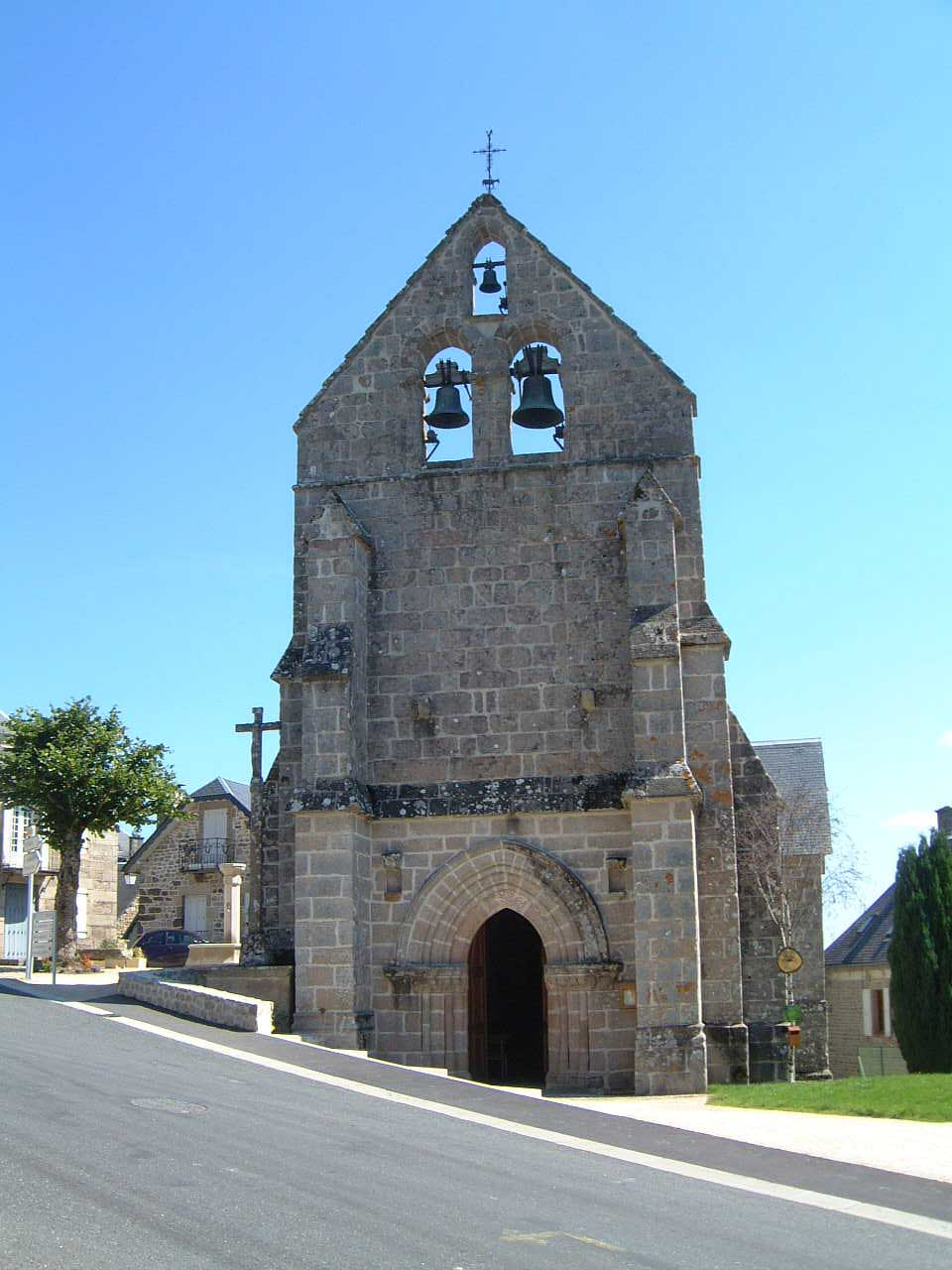
- The church in Saint-Setiers

- Coat of arms
- Location of Saint-Setiers
- Location within France Location within Nouvelle-Aquitaine
- Coordinates: 45°41′51″N 2°07′51″E
- Country: France
- Region: Nouvelle-Aquitaine
- Department: Corrèze
- Arrondissement: Ussel
- Canton: Plateau de Millevaches
- Intercommunality: Haute-Corrèze Communauté

Government
  - Mayor (2026–32): Daniel Mazière
- Area^{1}: 46.78 km^{2} (18.06 sq mi)
- Elevation: 850 m (2,790 ft)
- Highest elevation: 955 m (3,133 ft)
- Lowest elevation: 695 m (2,280 ft)
- Population (2023): 252
  - Density: 5.39/km^{2} (14.0/sq mi)
- Time zone: UTC+01:00 (CET)
  - Summer (DST): UTC+02:00 (CEST)
- INSEE/Postal code: 19241 /19290
- ^{1} French Land Register data, which excludes lakes, ponds, glaciers > 1 km^{2} (0.386 sq mi or 247 acres) and river estuaries.

Saint-Setiers (French pronunciation: [sɛ̃ sətje]; Occitan: Sent Sestari) is a commune in the Corrèze department in central France.

== Toponymy ==
The locality of Saint-Setiers appears in the archives in 1315 under the name Sancti Sagittarii, meaning " Saint Sagittarius".

== Geography ==
In the north-eastern quarter of the Corrèze department, on the Plateau de Millevaches, the commune of Saint-Setiers covers 46.78km2. It is located on the watershed between the Dordogne and Loire watersheds; it is bordered to the west by the Vienne for nearly two kilometres, and by the Villevaleix stream; it has its source in the municipal territory and becomes the Diège, boarding the commune to the south-east for nearly four kilometres.

== Population ==
Historical population
Year	Pop.	±% p.a.
1968	608	—
1975	298	−9.69%
1982	297	−0.05%
1990	281	−0.69%
1999	245	−1.51%
2007	237	−0.41%
2012	265	+2.26%
2017	285	+1.47%
2023	252	−2.03%
Source: INSEE

== Local culture and heritage ==
=== Places and monuments ===
Sanctuary of Saint Sagittarius

- L'Église Saint-Sagittarius in Saint-Setiers - church dates between the 13th to 19th-centuries and was is listed in the General Inventory of Cultural Heritage. Various religious objects and statues as well as furniture are included in the notices related to the church: kiss of peace, processional cross in wood and copper, Christ on the cross, statuette of the Immaculate Conception, wooden reliquary bust representing Saint Sagittarius.
- Sanctuary of Saint Sagittarius includes, on either side of an old Roman road, a chapel and a fountain. Several miracles are attributed to this local saint, a martyr of the first centuries of Christianity. His relics are placed in a reliquary bust located in the village church. It is carried in procession every year, on 13 May, from the church to the sanctuary.
- The Puy-Redon bridge over the Diège was built in 1899 between the Puy-Redon and the left bank of the Diège. The municipalities of Saint-Setiers and Sornac paid 8902 francs for the work. The departmental subsidies were 3886 francs, and those of the State 5016 francs.

=== Natural heritage ===
- Parc Naturel Régional de Millevaches en Limousin - the municipal territory is entirely located in the natural regional park.
- Parc Arboretum de Saint-Setiers - On the edge of the town of Saint-Setiers, there is a private arboretum park, open from May to October[33].

== See also ==
- Communes of the Corrèze department
