= Sornac =

- Commune
- Coat of arms
- Location of Sornac
- Location within France Location within Nouvelle-Aquitaine
- Coordinates: 45°40′05″N 2°11′39″E
- Country: France
- Region: Nouvelle-Aquitaine
- Department: Corrèze
- Arrondissement: Ussel
- Canton: Plateau de Millevaches
- Intercommunality: Haute-Corrèze Communauté

Government
  - Mayor (2020–2026): Jean-François Loge
- Area^{1}: 59.48 km^{2} (22.97 sq mi)
- Highest elevation: 958 m (3,143 ft)
- Lowest elevation: 660 m (2,170 ft)
- Population (2023): 776
  - Density: 13.0/km^{2} (33.8/sq mi)
- Time zone: UTC+01:00 (CET)
  - Summer (DST): UTC+02:00 (CEST)
- INSEE/Postal code: 19261 /19290
- ^{1} French Land Register data, which excludes lakes, ponds, glaciers > 1 km^{2} (0.386 sq mi or 247 acres) and river estuaries.

Sornac (French pronunciation: [sɔʁnak]; Occitan: Saurnac) is a commune in the Corrèze department in central France. The river Diège forms part of the commune's northwestern boundary, then flows south-southeast through the commune.

== Toponymy ==
Saornacum (10th century). From the proper name Saturninus, Gallo-Roman owner. Other forms exist in France such as Sadornac, Sadarnac, Sournac, Sornay having the same origin.

== Demographics ==
Historical population
Year	Pop.	±% p.a.
1968	1,017	—
1975	1,020	+0.04%
1982	1,125	+1.41%
1990	972	−1.81%
1999	851	−1.47%
2007	817	−0.51%
2012	837	+0.48%
2017	759	−1.94%
2023	776	+0.37%
Source: INSEE

== Local culture and heritage ==
=== Places and monuments ===
- Église Saint-Martin de Sornac - listed as a historical monument in 1927. The church, dating from 12th century, has a barrel vault, three chapels, and a three bay gabled bell tower.
- The Château de Rochefort (13th century) - rebuilt in 1620 (private house).

== See also ==
- Communes of the Corrèze department
