= Ussel, Corrèze =

Ussel Ussèl (Occitan)
- Subprefecture and commune
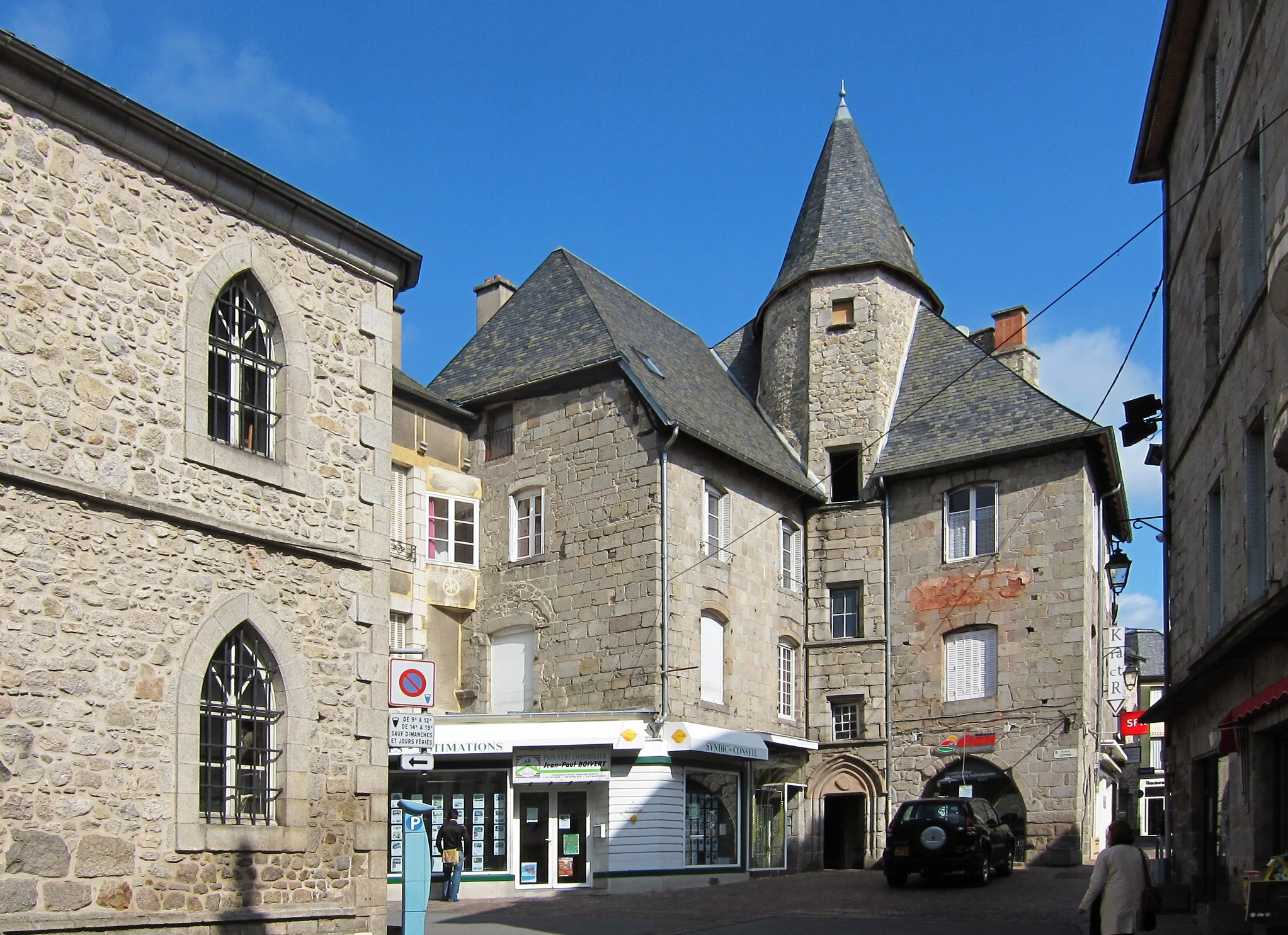
- Place Joffre in Ussel

- Coat of arms
- Location of Ussel
- Location within France Location within Nouvelle-Aquitaine
- Coordinates: 45°32′56″N 2°18′36″E
- Country: France
- Region: Nouvelle-Aquitaine
- Department: Corrèze
- Arrondissement: Ussel
- Canton: Ussel
- Intercommunality: Haute-Corrèze Communauté

Government
  - Mayor (2026–32): Jean-Pierre Guitard
- Area^{1}: 50.37 km^{2} (19.45 sq mi)
- Elevation: 630 m (2,070 ft)
- Highest elevation: 781 m (2,562 ft)
- Lowest elevation: 588 m (1,929 ft)
- Population (2023): 9,187
  - Density: 182.4/km^{2} (472.4/sq mi)
- Time zone: UTC+01:00 (CET)
  - Summer (DST): UTC+02:00 (CEST)
- INSEE/Postal code: 19275 /19200
- ^{1} French Land Register data, which excludes lakes, ponds, glaciers > 1 km^{2} (0.386 sq mi or 247 acres) and river estuaries.

Ussel (French pronunciation: [ysɛl]; Occitan: Ussèl) is a commune in the Corrèze department in central France. Its inhabitants are called Ussellois.

== Toponymy ==
The name of the city most likely comes from the Gaulish term "uxello" or "uxo" meaning "high".

Its name in Occitan is: Ussèl.

== History ==
=== The origins ===
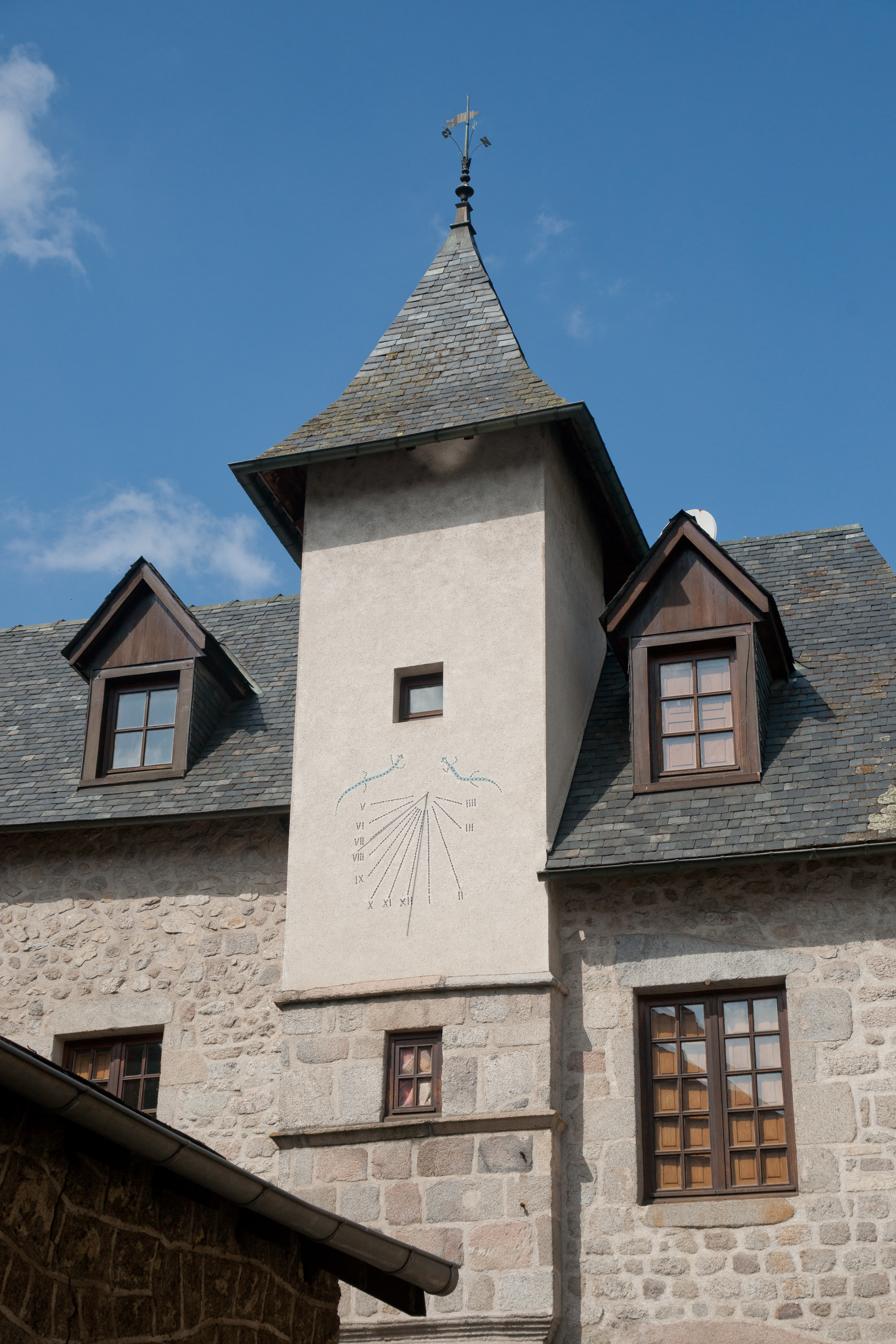
Wall-mounted sundial in the city center of Ussel.

The origin of Ussel dates back to the Gallic period (Iron Age), when the Corrèze site was part of the civitas (or city, territory) of the Lemovices.<re name=c01/> Moreover, its name, like its homonyms located in the departments of Cantal, Lot and Allier, probably comes from the Gallic Uxello-, or Uxo-, an adjective describing this site of height located between Diège and Sarsonne or describing a Celtic deity known under the theonym of Uxisama (see Oisseau-le-Petit).

The place was then defended by the oppidum of Charlat, also known as the oppidum (known as the oppidum of Caesar's Camp). The Charlat camp is a modest oppidum covering 1.4 ha, but numerous indications of occupation at its foot suggest that the area was dynamic and populated.

=== Middle Ages ===
In February 1371, during the Hundred Years' War, Bertrand du Guesclin laid siege to Ussel, which was occupied by the English.

=== Modern era ===
In the 16th-century, Ussel became the administrative centre of the Duke of Ventadour. Seigniorial justice was then moved from Égletons to Ussel.

From the 17th to 18th-centuries, Ussel was a town devoted to butchery and its related activities, including tannery, which gave the nickname Pelauds to its inhabitants.

=== Contemporary era ===
==== Second World War ====
On 7 July 1942, Marshal Pétain arrived in Ussel from the Camp de La Courtine (military camp) and received the honours of the 41st Infantry Regiment, then returned to his special train at Ussel station.

In 1944, the town experienced two particularly serious events: the Ussel Massacre and the Battle of Ussel.

- Ussel Massacre

At the time of the Normandy landings, a company of the 1st Regiment of France was stationed at the upper primary school and a German garrison of 180 soldiers belonging to the 95th Security Regiment at the Jean-Jaurès school. This garrison was mainly made up of young recruits from Reichenberg, in Sudetia. The German soldiers, feeling threatened, placed themselves under the protection of the 1st Regiment of France.
On 10 June 1944, the Germans massacred 47 young resistance members who had presented themselves in front of the upper primary school to take surrender of the German weapons guarded by the 1st Regiment of France.

- Battle of Ussel

Ussel was now the headquarters of General Curt von Jesser's Jesser Brigade, responsible for pacifying the region against the French Resistance, the Maquis du Limousin. The German brigade was attacked on the night of 15-16 August 1944 by a large detachment of maquisards from the Armée secrète and the FTP. Fierce fighting took place throughout the day of the 16th and ended during the night with the surrender of the Germans, who had 8 dead and 15 wounded and 88 of whom were taken prisoner. The Armée secrète had 3 dead and 11 wounded, and the FTP 3 dead and 16 wounded.

==== Post-war ====
The commune merged with Saint-Dézery by a prefectural decree of 30 December 1972, and then with La Tourette by prefectural decree of 26 November 1976. These two former municipalities have since been associated municipalities.

== Geography ==
=== Location ===
The community of Ussel is located in the Massif central on the foothills of the plateau de Millevaches. The city itself sits on a hilltop in between the valley of the river Diège and the valley of the river Sarsonne. It is situated at an altitude of 2070 ft (631 m), in the Massif Central on the last buttress of the Plateau de Millevaches. Ussel is crossed by the Green Meridian.

=== Hydrography ===
Three main watercourses flow through the community, the river Diège (the town is sometimes also called Ussel-sur-Diège), the river Sarsonne and the stream of Étang Roux.

=== Climate ===
Climate data for Ussel, elevation 654 m (2,146 ft), (1991–2020 normals, extremes 1937–present)
Month	Jan	Feb	Mar	Apr	May	Jun	Jul	Aug	Sep	Oct	Nov	Dec	Year
Record high °C (°F)	19.2 (66.6)	26.2 (79.2)	26.0 (78.8)	29.6 (85.3)	33.1 (91.6)	39.1 (102.4)	38.6 (101.5)	38.4 (101.1)	35.4 (95.7)	31.4 (88.5)	24.1 (75.4)	21.8 (71.2)	39.1 (102.4)
Mean daily maximum °C (°F)	7.0 (44.6)	8.2 (46.8)	12.2 (54.0)	15.0 (59.0)	19.0 (66.2)	22.7 (72.9)	25.0 (77.0)	25.0 (77.0)	20.8 (69.4)	16.4 (61.5)	10.6 (51.1)	7.6 (45.7)	15.8 (60.4)
Daily mean °C (°F)	2.7 (36.9)	3.1 (37.6)	6.2 (43.2)	8.7 (47.7)	12.5 (54.5)	16.1 (61.0)	18.0 (64.4)	17.8 (64.0)	14.0 (57.2)	10.6 (51.1)	6.0 (42.8)	3.3 (37.9)	9.9 (49.8)
Mean daily minimum °C (°F)	−1.6 (29.1)	−2.0 (28.4)	0.2 (32.4)	2.3 (36.1)	5.9 (42.6)	9.4 (48.9)	11.0 (51.8)	10.6 (51.1)	7.3 (45.1)	4.9 (40.8)	1.4 (34.5)	−1.0 (30.2)	4.0 (39.2)
Record low °C (°F)	−27.0 (−16.6)	−26.0 (−14.8)	−19.3 (−2.7)	−10.1 (13.8)	−7.0 (19.4)	−3.0 (26.6)	−1.0 (30.2)	−2.0 (28.4)	−3.0 (26.6)	−7.5 (18.5)	−12.9 (8.8)	−22.0 (−7.6)	−27.0 (−16.6)
Average precipitation mm (inches)	99.5 (3.92)	82.7 (3.26)	81.2 (3.20)	104.9 (4.13)	100.4 (3.95)	90.3 (3.56)	80.0 (3.15)	82.6 (3.25)	93.7 (3.69)	99.9 (3.93)	122.7 (4.83)	118.2 (4.65)	1,156.1 (45.52)
Average precipitation days (≥ 1.0 mm)	13.8	12.1	11.3	12.0	12.0	10.2	8.5	9.2	10.1	12.0	14.3	13.8	139.6
Source: Meteociel

== Demography ==
Historical population
Year	Pop.	±% p.a.
1968	8,464	—
1975	10,664	+3.36%
1982	11,765	+1.41%
1990	11,448	−0.34%
1999	10,753	−0.69%
2007	10,328	−0.50%
2012	9,791	−1.06%
2017	9,736	−0.11%
2023	9,187	−0.96%
Source: INSEE

== Economy ==
=== Forest products and wood ===
Ussel houses many company in the wood field, including panel producer MDF Isoroy, stratified clothes designer Polyrey, and door manufacturers Jeld Wen and Bel .

=== Mining and steel ===
The Des farges mine, located 3 kilometers from Ussel, is part of Nouvelle-Aquitaine's mining. The extraction of lead was applied, as well as silver and much more, until its closure in 1981. La Société des fonderies d'Ussel (SFU) is one of the metallurgical representative of the region.

=== Food processing ===
The commune is in the centre of a farming region and has the bovine breed limousin. The pork butcher group Loste owns a production site of salted meat in the industrial area. Regional products are beef and pork, hunting and fishing products, and harvest products (cep, chanterelle, blueberry). Local dishes include the tourtou and the farcidure.

=== Pharmaceutical industry ===
The industrial sector sets up in High-Corrèze since 1990 when Bristol-Myers Squibb settles a production site in the town of Meymac. In 1999, Pierre Fabre came to Ussel by building a distribution and logistics center in the industrial zone of L'Empereur. The company Chesapeake features a production unit specializing in packaging for the pharmaceutical industry (holsters and instructions), also located in the industrial zone of "The Emperor".

== Culture ==
=== Museum of Ussel ===
The museum of Ussel is dedicated to history, arts and tradition of the region of Ussel. It features some objects and pictorial representations. Another part is devoted to the history of printing and exhibitions of engraving. Many of the objects exhibited concerning agricultural trades were provided by Dr. Ernest Chiocconi, a salvage dealer. He had recovered objects in agricultural holdings which were no longer used.

== Culture and heritage ==
=== Places and monuments ===
==== Castles ====
- Château de La Borde - 15th-century castle, remodelled during the 17th-century. Private hotel.
- Château de la Diège - 14th-century
- Château du Theil - 15th-century, now a private hotel.
- The Mothe Castle, 16th century, historical monument since 1980.
- Hôtel Ventadour - Is residence designed in a renaissance style with doors and windows date from 16th-century. A listed historical monument since 1932.
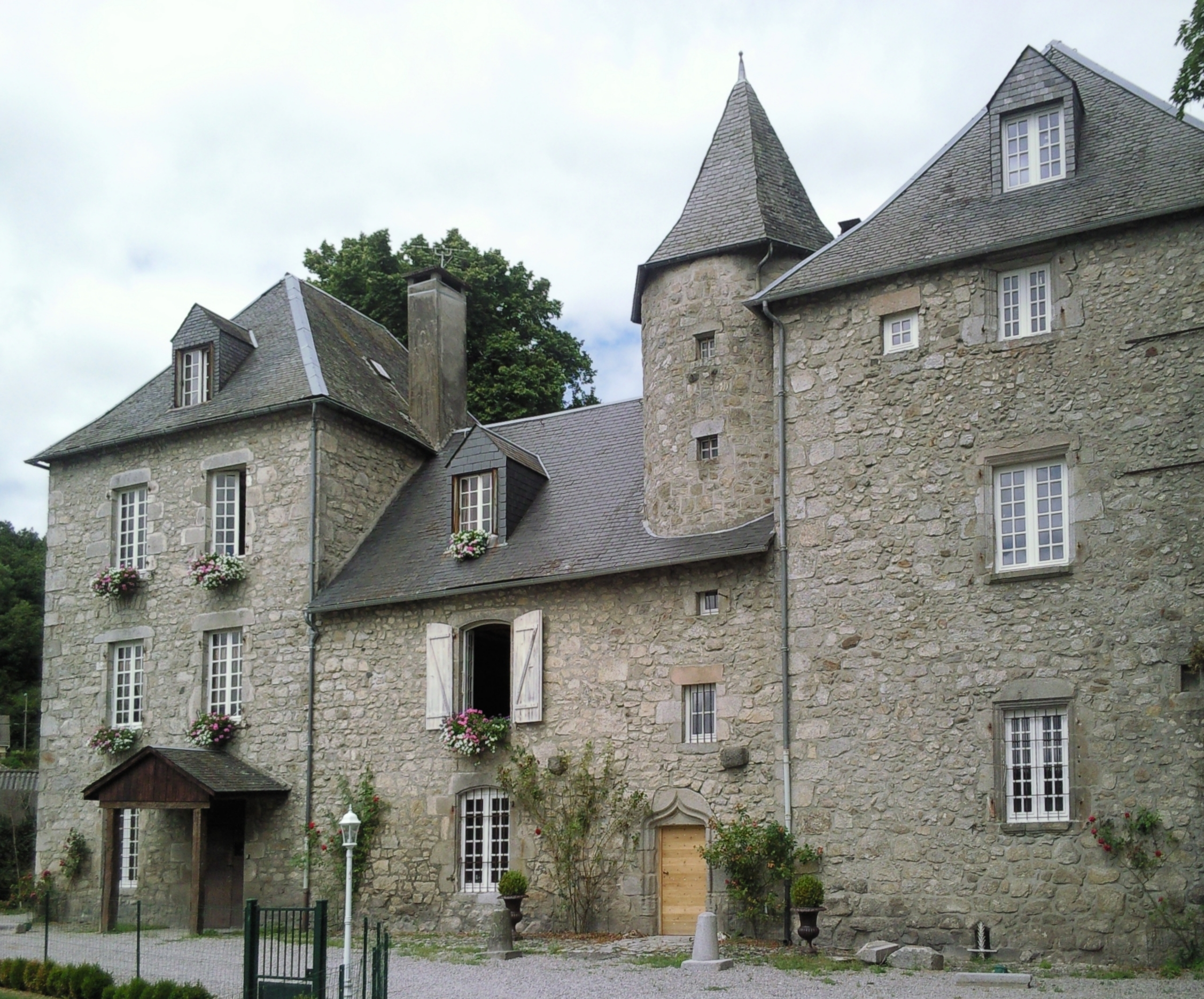
Château de La Borde.

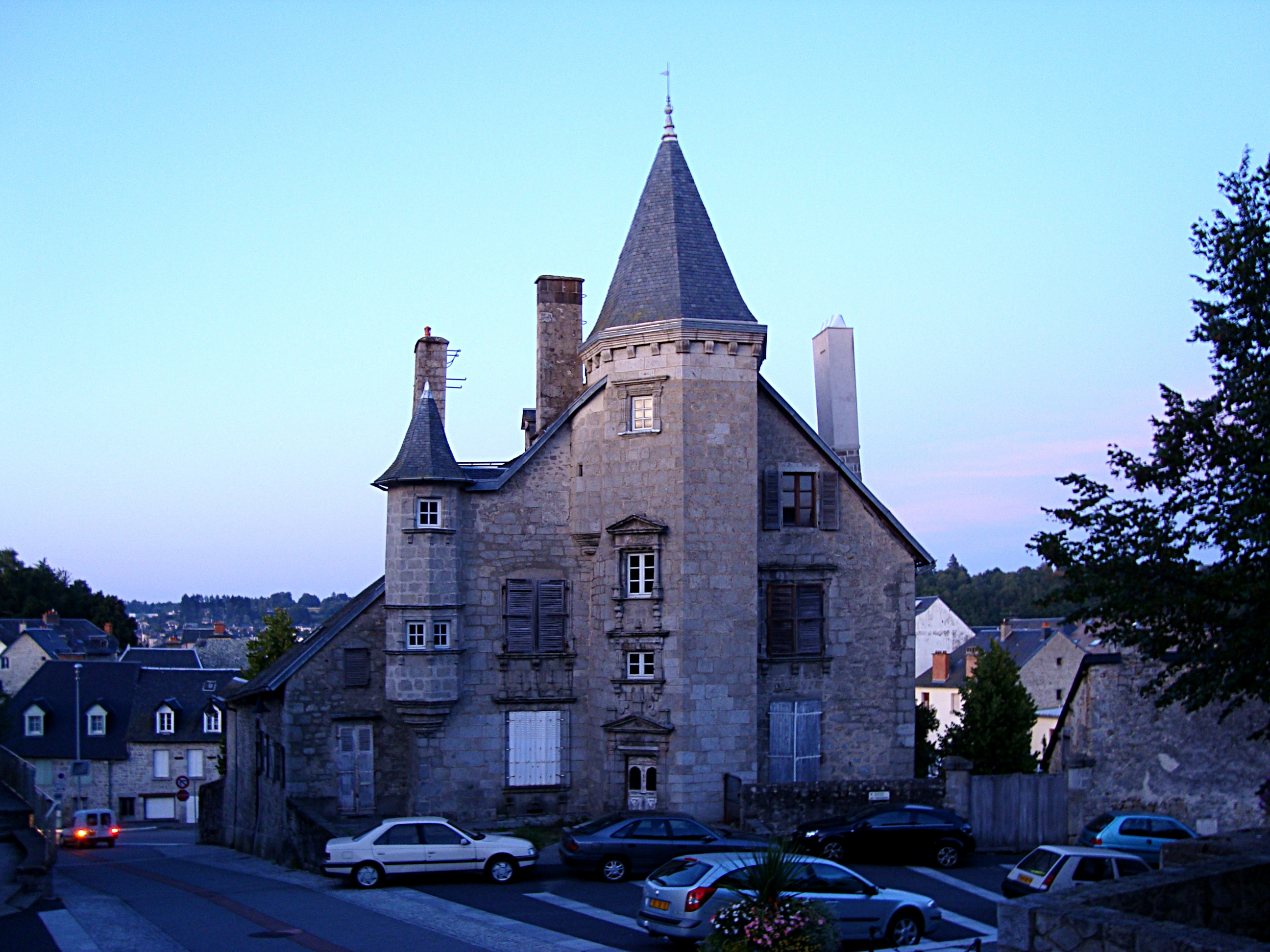
Hôtel Ventadour.

==== Churches and chapels ====
- Église Saint-Martin - 13th-century church was built between 1250 and 1350. The apse is older, Romanesque in style, from 12th-century. The side aisles were added in 15th and 16th-centuries and are Gothic in style. The quadrangular tower and granite spire dates from 1862, replacing the bell tower destroyed lightning in 1838. The chancel woodwork and choir stalls date from 18th-century. The church was listed as a classified historical monument since 1926.
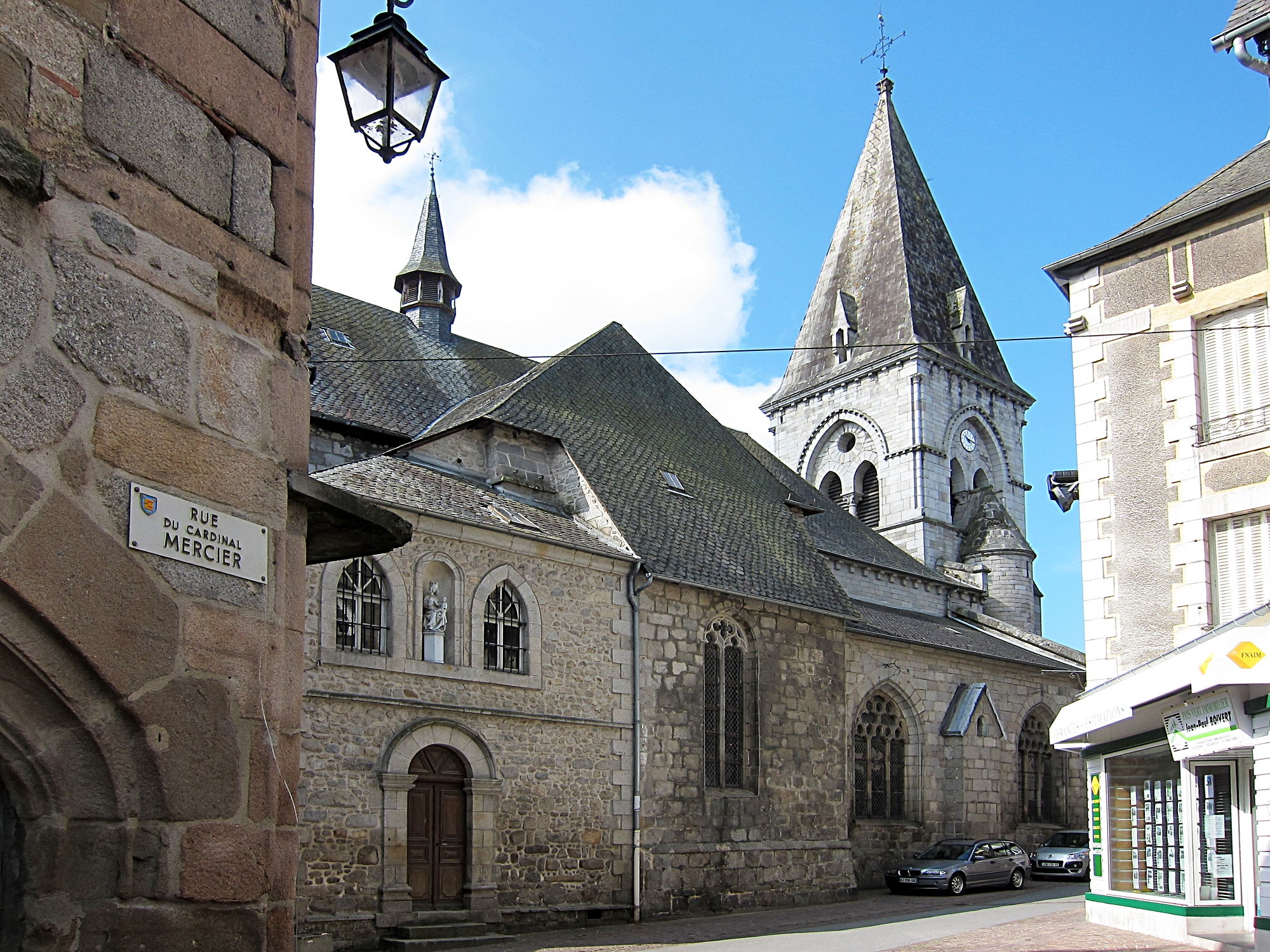
Église Saint-Martin.

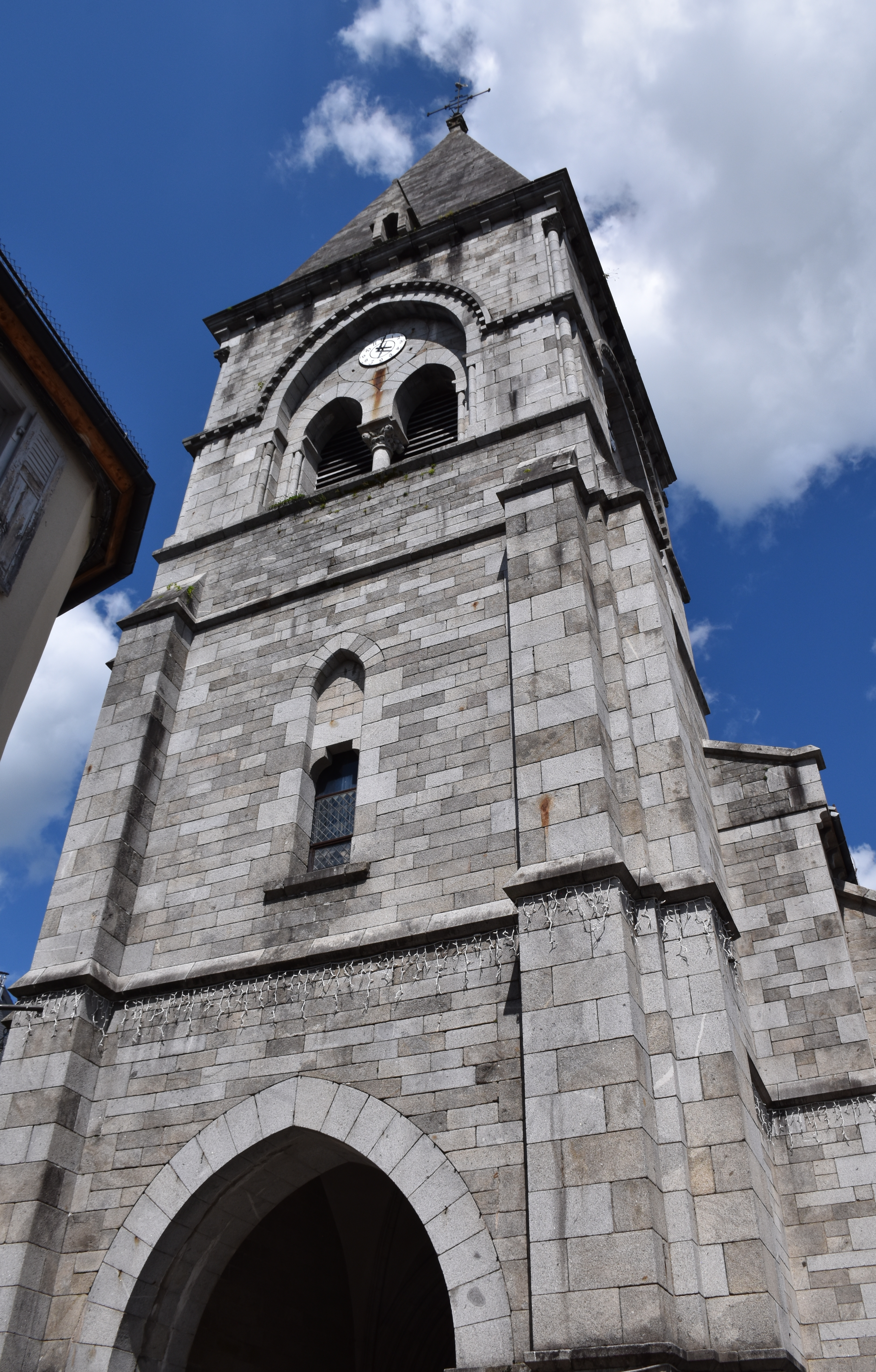
The bell tower.

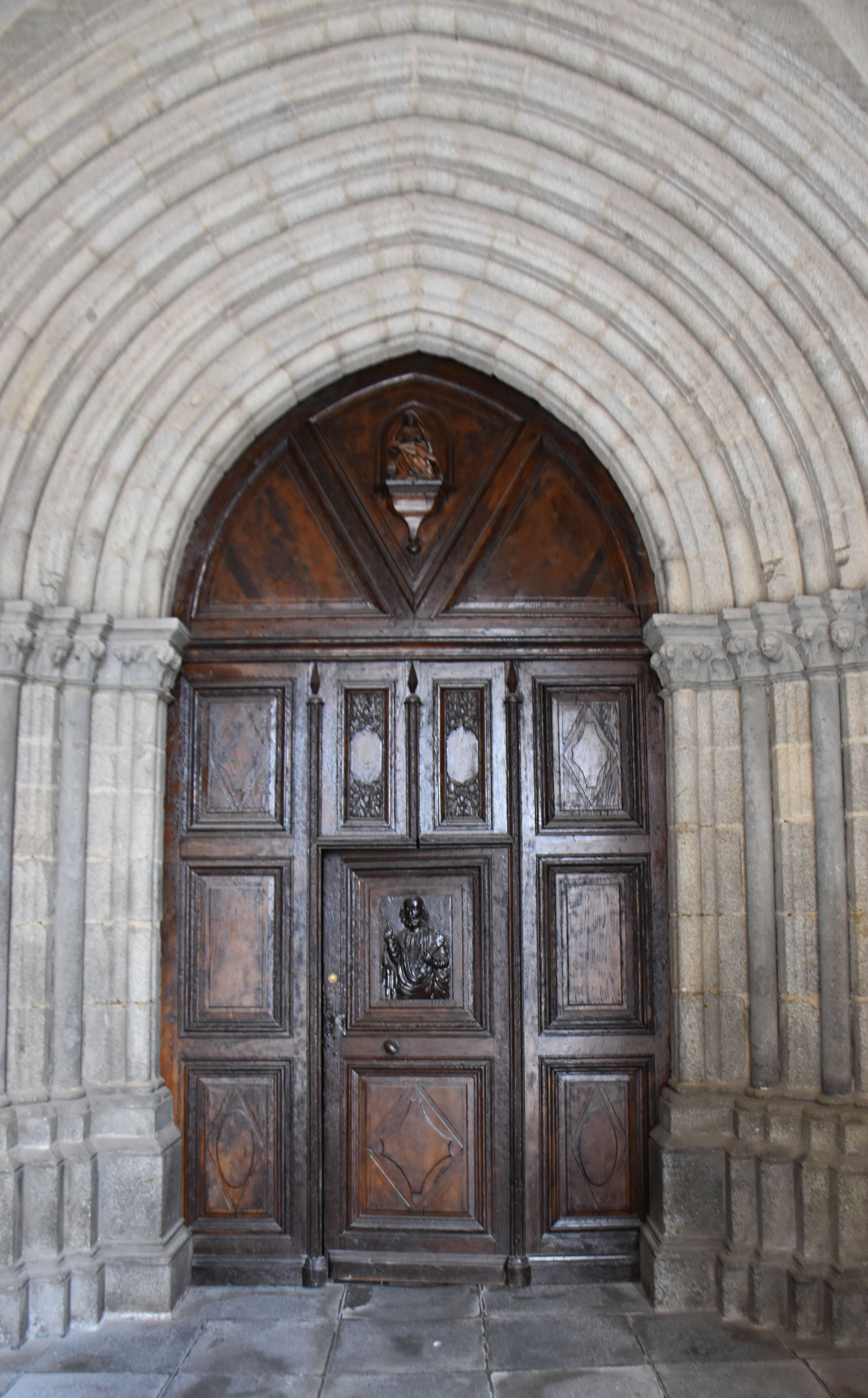
The main portal.

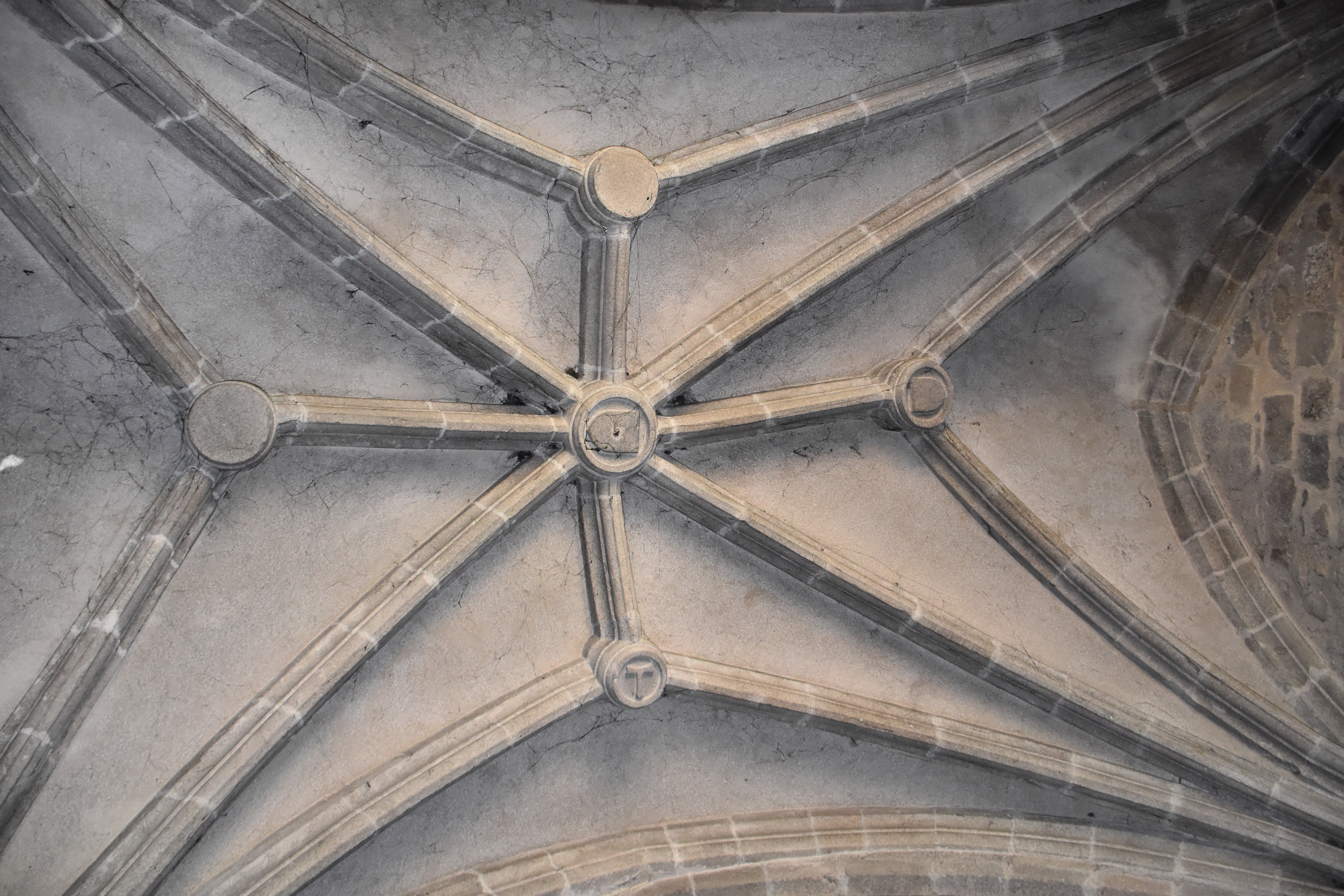
Keystone with coat of arms.

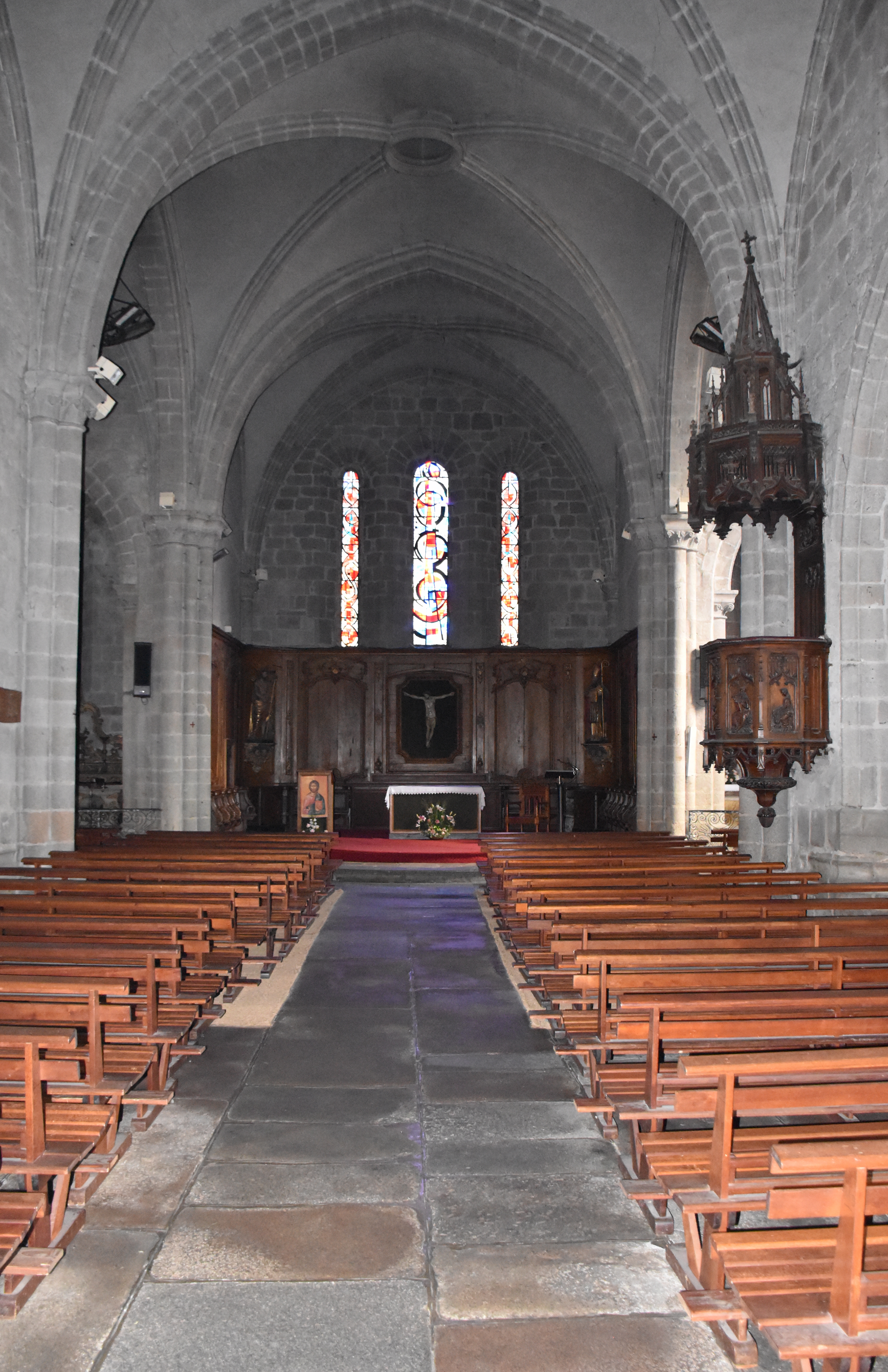
The nave.

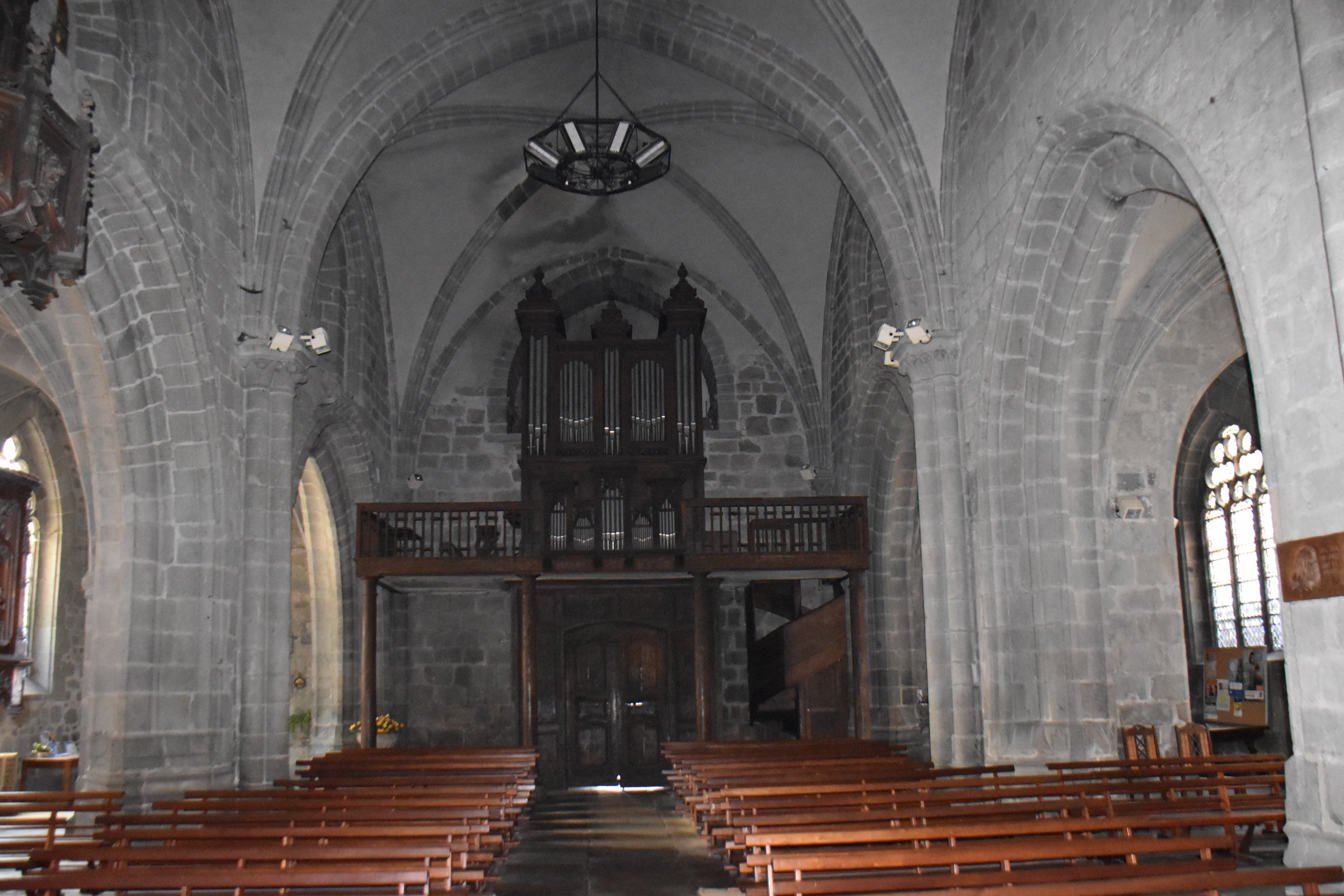
The nave on the porch side.

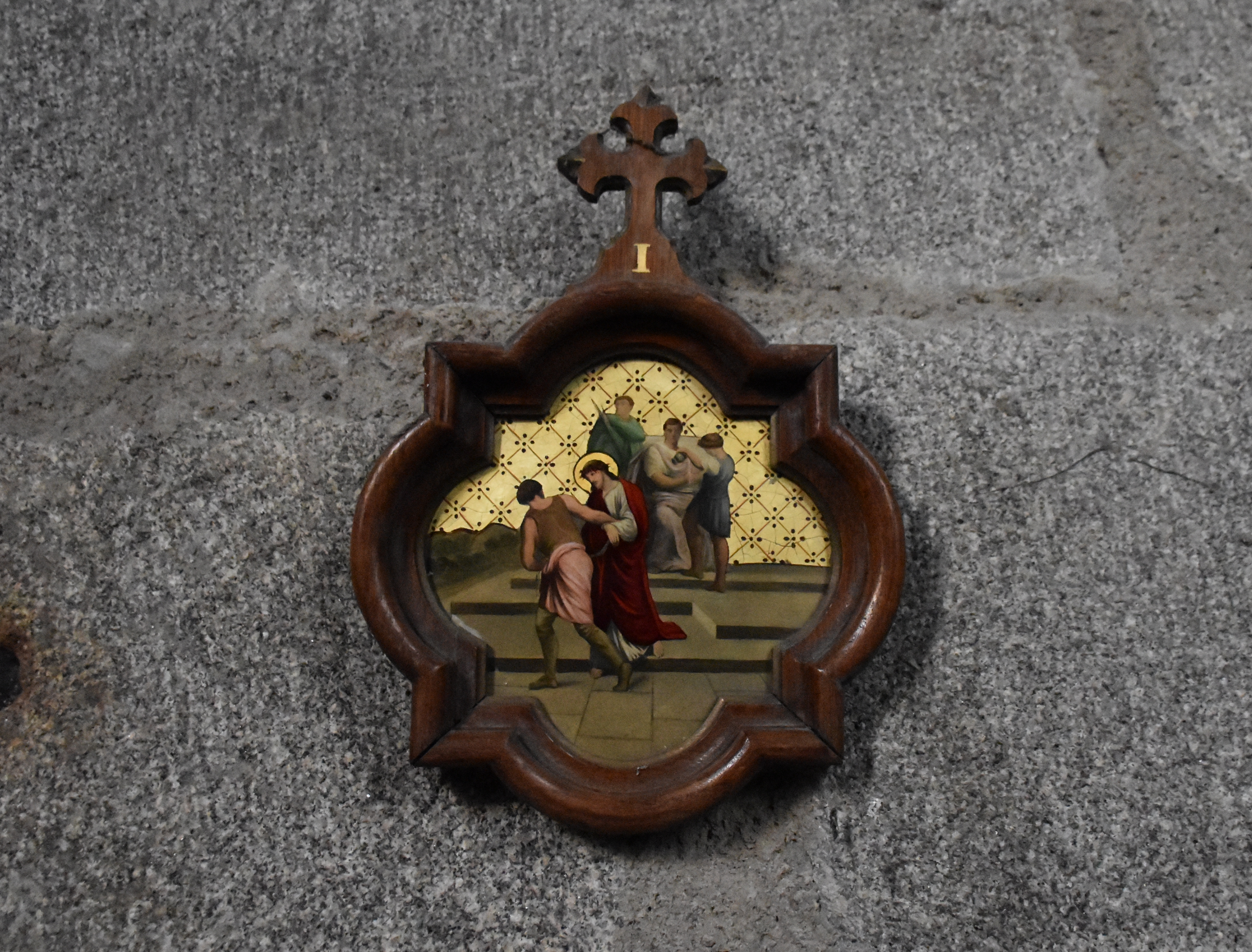
Stations of the Cross, 1st station.
- Chapelle Notre-Dame de la Chabanne - was built in 12th-century and then rebuilt in 1640 before being damaged during the French Revolution, rebuilt again 1804. It is semi-circular in shape, and has wooded altar and statute of the Virgin.
- Chapelle Saint-Martial (known as the Chapel of the Penitents) - dedicated to Saint Martial it was built in 14th and 15th-centuries. In 1747, it was brought under the control of the Blue Penitents. Now a museum, Musée du Pays d'Ussel.
- Chapelle de l'Hôpital des Filles de la Charité - destroyed around 1953.
- Notre-Dame-de-Bonne-Nouvelle - was situated in the old cemetery, attested to in 1793, now disappeared.
- Les Ursulines - became the court of Ussel, Boulevard Clemenceau, and of which only the façade remains and the Chapelle of Saint-Joseph, now destroyed.
- Les Récollets Saint-Joseph - a former convent on what is now Place Voltaire, razed to the ground after the war following the fire of 16-17 August 1944 during the fighting for the liberation of Ussel.
- Chapelle Saint-Charles du collège - now destroyed, Avenue Carnot.
- Chapelle des Pénitents blancs - destroyed in 1793.
- Chapelle Saint-Jean-Baptiste - located on the terrace of the castle, destroyed in 1637.
- Église Notre-Dame-de-l'Assomption - in La Tourette
- Église Saint-Dizier - in Saint-Dézéry

==== Other ====
- Aigle romaine (The Roman Eagle) - this 800kg monumental sculpture dated approximately at the end of the 2nd to the beginning of the 3rd-century, carved in granite, was discovered at the Moulin du Peuch, on the Sarsonne, on the site of the oppidum of Peyrot, which was the cradle of the town. It was a crowning element of a funerary monument. It was cleaned and moved in 2009.
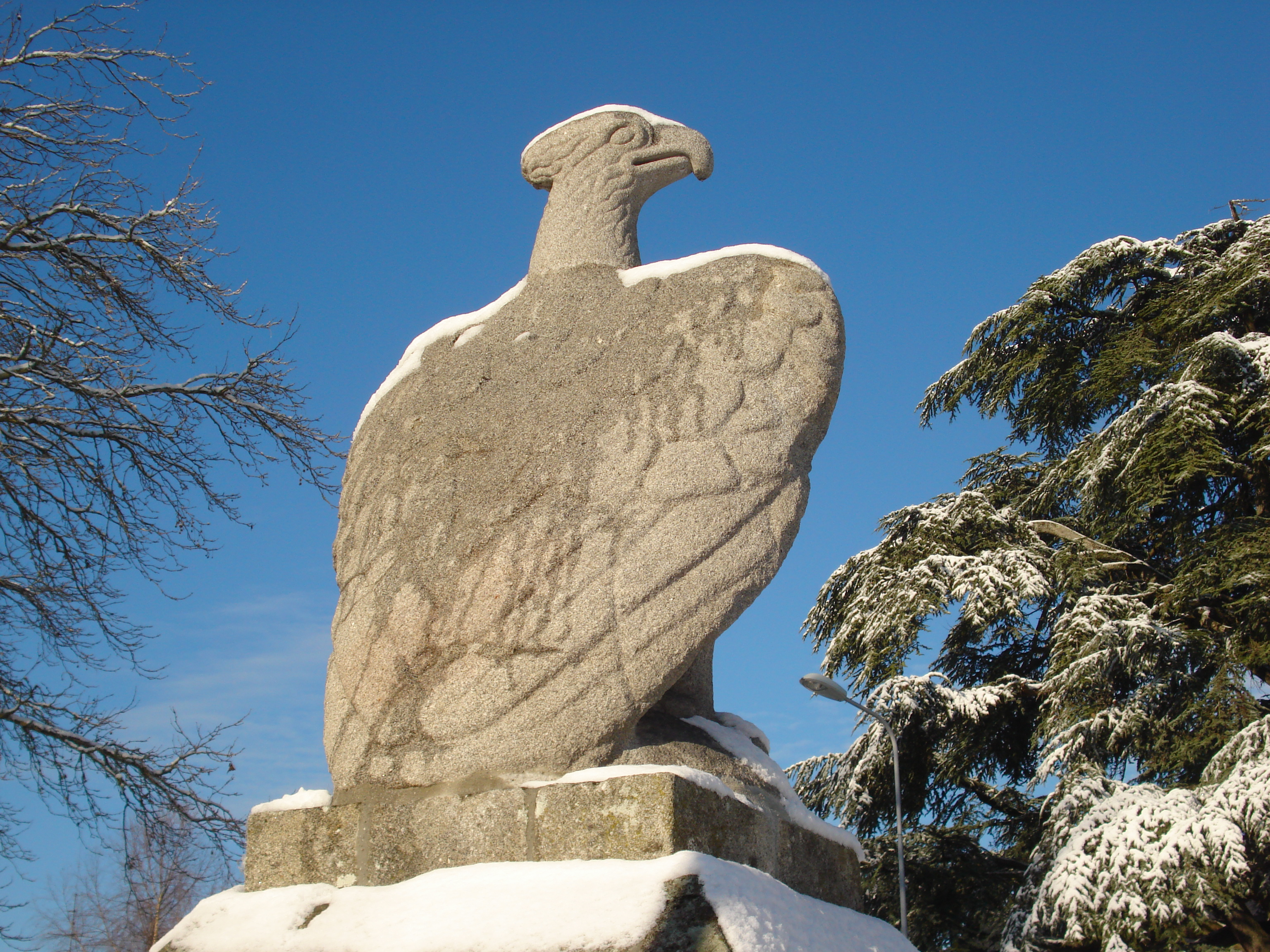
L'aigle de la place Voltaire.

=== Transcorrezien Railway Line ===
Ussel was the northern terminus of the Metre Gauge Transcorrezien railway line linking Tulle to Ussel via Marcillac-la-Croisille, Lapleau, Soursac and Liginiac. This line was part of the narrow gauge network of railways in the Corrèze region.

While the line has disappeared, many architectural and track elements still remain and can be visited by the public. Many of the stations are preserved and have been restored and a Tourist Route created which enables visitors to follow the track from its terminus at Languenne on the outskirts of Tulle to Ussel. The road signs are rectangular with "Transcorrezien" shown on them on a white background

The area includes the Viaduc des Rochers Noirs, a suspension bridge crossing the deep gorge of the Luzège river between Lapleau and Soursac. It is possible to visit both ends of the bridge but, while it remains in good condition, it is closed even to pedestrians.

The Soursac end of the bridge leads straight into a 150 m-long curved tunnel. Visitors can park at the Soursac end, walk through the tunnel (which is lit) and emerge by the bridge.

== Parks and greenspace ==
Ussel has many green and natural areas, and is also Ussel is composed of a large number of natural spaces, with hiking and walking trails. The municipality has been awarded 'trois fleurs' (three flowers, out of a total of four) by the Villes et villages fleuris.

== Infrastructure ==
=== Transportation ===
==== Roads ====
The commune is served by two main exits onto the A89 highway: exit 23 (Mauriac-Maymac-Ussel Ouest) to the south west of the town and exit 24 (Ussel Est-Eygurande) to the north east. Ussel is also crossed by the RN 89.

==== Rail ====
Ussel station lies on a main railway line linking Lyon to Bordeaux. As of 2026, there are TER Nouvelle-Aquitaine services to Bordeaux, Brive-la-Gaillarde, and Limoges.

==== Airports ====
The closest commercial airports are Brive–Souillac Airport, Limoges–Bellegarde Airport, and Clermont-Ferrand Auvergne Airport. A few kilometres away from the commune is the Ussel-Thalamy Airport, a small civilian airport.

== Twinning ==
Ussel is paired with Auray (France), located in the Morbihan department.

== See also ==
- Communes of the Corrèze department
