= Sainte-Marie-Lapanouze =

- Commune
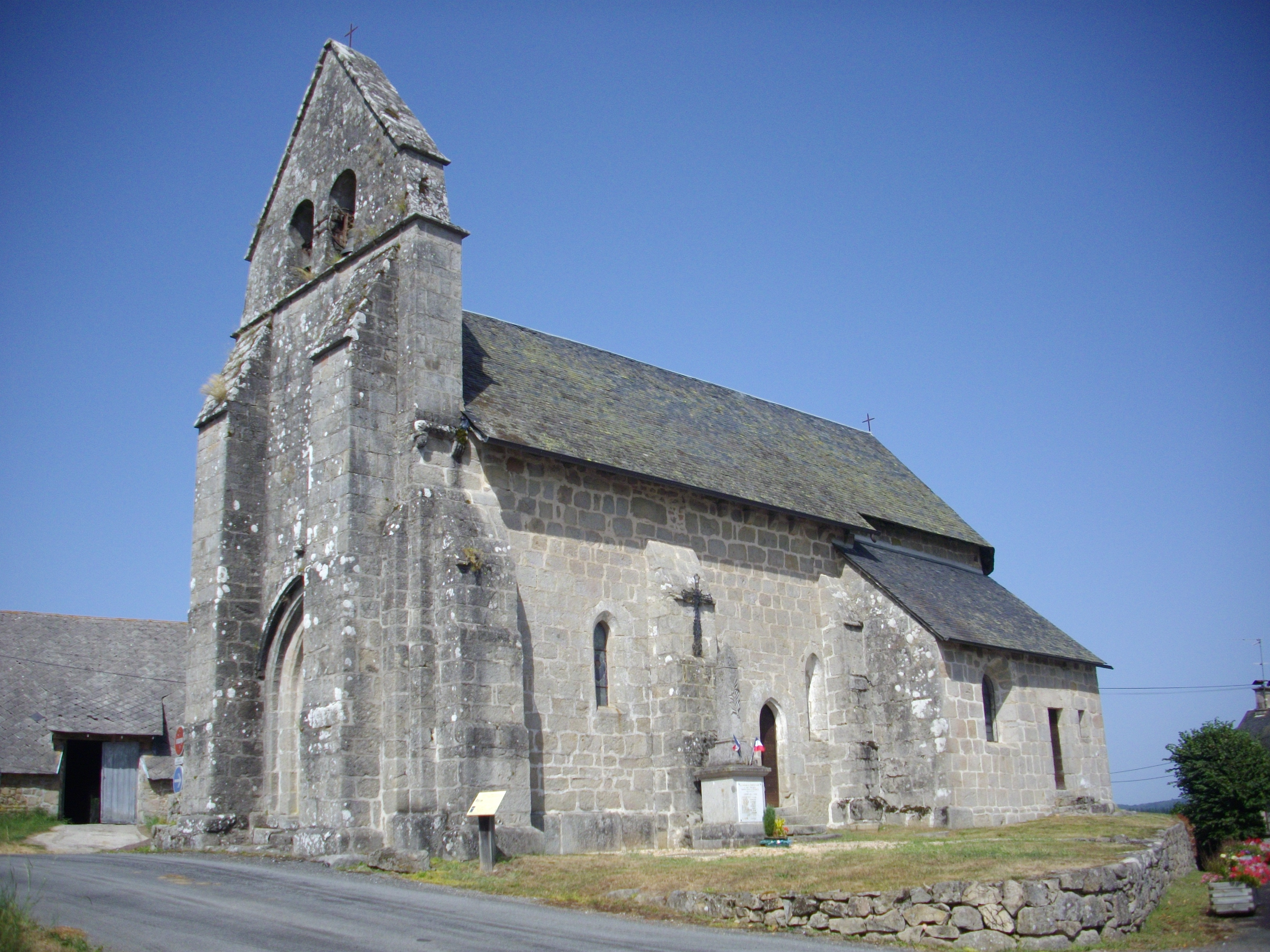
- The church in Sainte-Marie-Lapanouze

- Coat of arms
- Location of Sainte-Marie-Lapanouze
- Location within France Location within Nouvelle-Aquitaine
- Coordinates: 45°25′56″N 2°20′29″E
- Country: France
- Region: Nouvelle-Aquitaine
- Department: Corrèze
- Arrondissement: Ussel
- Canton: Haute-Dordogne
- Intercommunality: Haute-Corrèze Communauté

Government
  - Mayor (2020–2026): Jeanine Bringoux
- Area^{1}: 6.63 km^{2} (2.56 sq mi)
- Elevation: 600 m (2,000 ft)
- Highest elevation: 646 m (2,119 ft)
- Lowest elevation: 409 m (1,342 ft)
- Population (2023): 64
  - Density: 9.7/km^{2} (25/sq mi)
- Time zone: UTC+01:00 (CET)
  - Summer (DST): UTC+02:00 (CEST)
- INSEE/Postal code: 19219 /19160
- ^{1} French Land Register data, which excludes lakes, ponds, glaciers > 1 km^{2} (0.386 sq mi or 247 acres) and river estuaries.

Sainte-Marie-Lapanouze (French pronunciation: [sɛ̃t maʁi lapanuz]; Occitan: Senta Maria la Panosa) is a commune in the Corrèze department in central France.

== Geography ==
The river Dordogne forms part of the commune's southern boundary; the Diège, a tributary of the Dordogne, forms part of its northeastern boundary.

== Population ==
Historical population
| Year | Pop. | ±% p.a. |
|---|---|---|
| 1968 | 88 | — |
| 1975 | 71 | −3.02% |
| 1982 | 66 | −1.04% |
| 1990 | 53 | −2.70% |
| 1999 | 43 | −2.30% |
| 2007 | 57 | +3.59% |
| 2012 | 62 | +1.70% |
| 2017 | 59 | −0.99% |
| 2023 | 64 | +1.36% |
Source: INSEE

== See also ==
- Communes of the Corrèze department
