= Parc Arboretum de Saint-Setiers =

Private park and arboretum in Corrèze, Limousin, France

Coordinates: 45°41′51″N 2°07′51″E

The Parc Arboretum de Saint-Setiers is a private park and arboretum located in Saint-Setiers, Corrèze, Limousin, France. It is open daily in the warmer months; an admission fee is charged.

The park and its arboretum were established in the 19th century, and now contain about 115 species of trees and shrubs including a Thujopsis specimen dating from 1802 and a large Douglas fir from 1895, as well as a 5 kilometer forest trail, a river island covered with rhododendrons, and a monumental earthen sculpture (La Grande Nageuse) by Gerhard Lentink. It is also possible to see the sculpture of Marc Duquesnoy realized in 2008, in the trunk of a tree: the wood combined with the porcelain.

== See also ==
- List of botanical gardens in France
