= Haute-Corrèze Communauté =

Federation of municipalities in France

- Communauté de communes
- Interactive map of Haute-Corrèze Communauté
- Coordinates: 45°33′N 2°19′E
- Country: France
- Region: Nouvelle-Aquitaine
- Department: Corrèze, Creuse
- No. of communes: {{{nbcomm}}}
- Established: 2017
- Area: 1,784.6 km^{2} (689.0 sq mi)
- Population (2018): 32,003
  - Density: 17.933/km^{2} (46.446/sq mi)
- Website: www.hautecorrezecommunaute.fr

Haute-Corrèze Communauté is a communauté de communes, an intercommunal structure, in the Corrèze and Creuse departments, in the Nouvelle-Aquitaine region, central France. It was created in January 2017 by the merger of the former communautés de communes Ussel - Meymac - Haute-Corrèze, Pays d'Eygurande, Gorges de la Haute-Dordogne, Val et Plateaux Bortois, Sources de la Creuse and part of Bugeat - Sornac - Millevaches au Cœur. In January 2023 the commune Bugeat left the community and joined the communauté de communes Vézère-Monédières-Millesources. Its area is 1784.6 km^{2}, and its population was 32,003 in 2021. Its seat is in Ussel.

== Communes ==
The communauté de communes consists of the following 70 communes, of which 11 in the Creuse department:

Corrèze:

1. Aix
2. Alleyrat
3. Ambrugeat
4. Bellechassagne
5. Bort-les-Orgues
6. Chavanac
7. Chaveroche
8. Chirac-Bellevue
9. Combressol
10. Confolent-Port-Dieu
11. Couffy-sur-Sarsonne
12. Courteix
13. Davignac
14. Eygurande
15. Feyt
16. Lamazière-Basse
17. Lamazière-Haute
18. Laroche-près-Feyt
19. Latronche
20. Liginiac
21. Lignareix
22. Margerides
23. Maussac
24. Merlines
25. Mestes
26. Meymac
27. Millevaches
28. Monestier-Merlines
29. Monestier-Port-Dieu
30. Neuvic
31. Palisse
32. Pérols-sur-Vézère
33. Peyrelevade
34. Roche-le-Peyroux
35. Saint-Angel
36. Saint-Bonnet-près-Bort
37. Sainte-Marie-Lapanouze
38. Saint-Étienne-aux-Clos
39. Saint-Étienne-la-Geneste
40. Saint-Exupéry-les-Roches
41. Saint-Fréjoux
42. Saint-Germain-Lavolps
43. Saint-Hilaire-Luc
44. Saint-Merd-les-Oussines
45. Saint-Pantaléon-de-Lapleau
46. Saint-Pardoux-le-Neuf
47. Saint-Pardoux-le-Vieux
48. Saint-Rémy
49. Saint-Setiers
50. Saint-Sulpice-les-Bois
51. Saint-Victour
52. Sarroux-Saint Julien
53. Sérandon
54. Sornac
55. Soursac
56. Thalamy
57. Ussel
58. Valiergues
59. Veyrières

Creuse:

1. Beissat
2. Clairavaux
3. La Courtine
4. Féniers
5. Magnat-l'Étrange
6. Malleret
7. Le Mas-d'Artige
8. Poussanges
9. Saint-Martial-le-Vieux
10. Saint-Merd-la-Breuille
11. Saint-Oradoux-de-Chirouze
