= Saint-Pardoux-le-Vieux =

- Commune
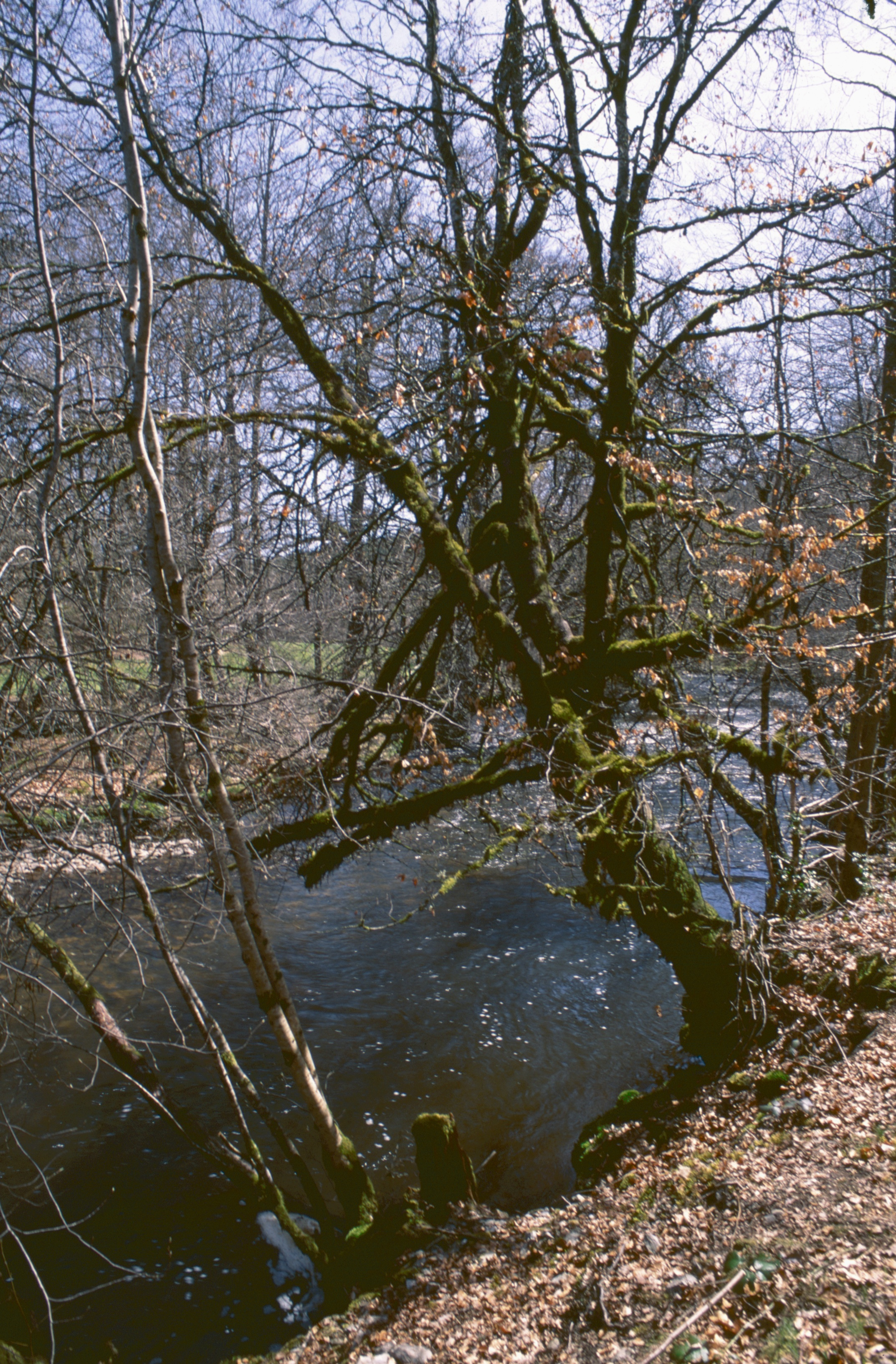
- The Diège near Confolent, Saint-Pardoux-le-Vieux

- Coat of arms
- Location of Saint-Pardoux-le-Vieux
- Location within France Location within Nouvelle-Aquitaine
- Coordinates: 45°36′23″N 2°16′37″E
- Country: France
- Region: Nouvelle-Aquitaine
- Department: Corrèze
- Arrondissement: Ussel
- Canton: Plateau de Millevaches
- Intercommunality: Haute-Corrèze Communauté

Government
  - Mayor (2020–2026): Philippe Roche
- Area^{1}: 15.80 km^{2} (6.10 sq mi)
- Elevation: 710 m (2,330 ft)
- Highest elevation: 773 m (2,536 ft)
- Lowest elevation: 610 m (2,000 ft)
- Population (2023): 293
  - Density: 18.5/km^{2} (48.0/sq mi)
- Time zone: UTC+01:00 (CET)
  - Summer (DST): UTC+02:00 (CEST)
- INSEE/Postal code: 19233 /19200
- ^{1} French Land Register data, which excludes lakes, ponds, glaciers > 1 km^{2} (0.386 sq mi or 247 acres) and river estuaries.

Saint-Pardoux-le-Vieux (French pronunciation: [sɛ̃ paʁdu lə vjø]; Occitan: Sent Pardós lo Vielh) is a commune in the Corrèze department in central France.

== Geography ==
The river Diège forms all of the commune's southwestern boundary.

== Population ==
Historical population
Year	Pop.	±% p.a.
1968	229	—
1975	208	−1.36%
1982	218	+0.67%
1990	185	−2.03%
1999	239	+2.89%
2007	286	+2.27%
2012	283	−0.21%
2017	297	+0.97%
2023	293	−0.23%
Source: INSEE

== See also ==
- Communes of the Corrèze department
