= Saint-Germain-Lavolps =

- Commune
- Coat of arms
- Location of Saint-Germain-Lavolps
- Location within France Location within Nouvelle-Aquitaine
- Coordinates: 45°36′51″N 2°12′24″E
- Country: France
- Region: Nouvelle-Aquitaine
- Department: Corrèze
- Arrondissement: Ussel
- Canton: Plateau de Millevaches
- Intercommunality: Haute-Corrèze Communauté

Government
  - Mayor (2020–2026): Didier Peneloux
- Area^{1}: 21.89 km^{2} (8.45 sq mi)
- Elevation: 735 m (2,411 ft)
- Highest elevation: 856 m (2,808 ft)
- Lowest elevation: 639 m (2,096 ft)
- Population (2023): 102
  - Density: 4.66/km^{2} (12.1/sq mi)
- Time zone: UTC+01:00 (CET)
  - Summer (DST): UTC+02:00 (CEST)
- INSEE/Postal code: 19206 /19290
- ^{1} French Land Register data, which excludes lakes, ponds, glaciers > 1 km^{2} (0.386 sq mi or 247 acres) and river estuaries.

Saint-Germain-Lavolps is a commune in the Corrèze department in central France.

== Geography ==
The river Triouzoune forms part of the commune's southwestern aboundary; the Diège flows southeast through the commune.

== Population ==
Historical population
Year	Pop.	±% p.a.
1968	94	—
1975	82	−1.93%
1982	82	+0.00%
1990	99	+2.38%
1999	93	−0.69%
2007	92	−0.14%
2012	88	−0.89%
2017	87	−0.23%
2023	102	+2.69%
Source: INSEE

== See also ==
- Communes of the Corrèze department
