= Diège =

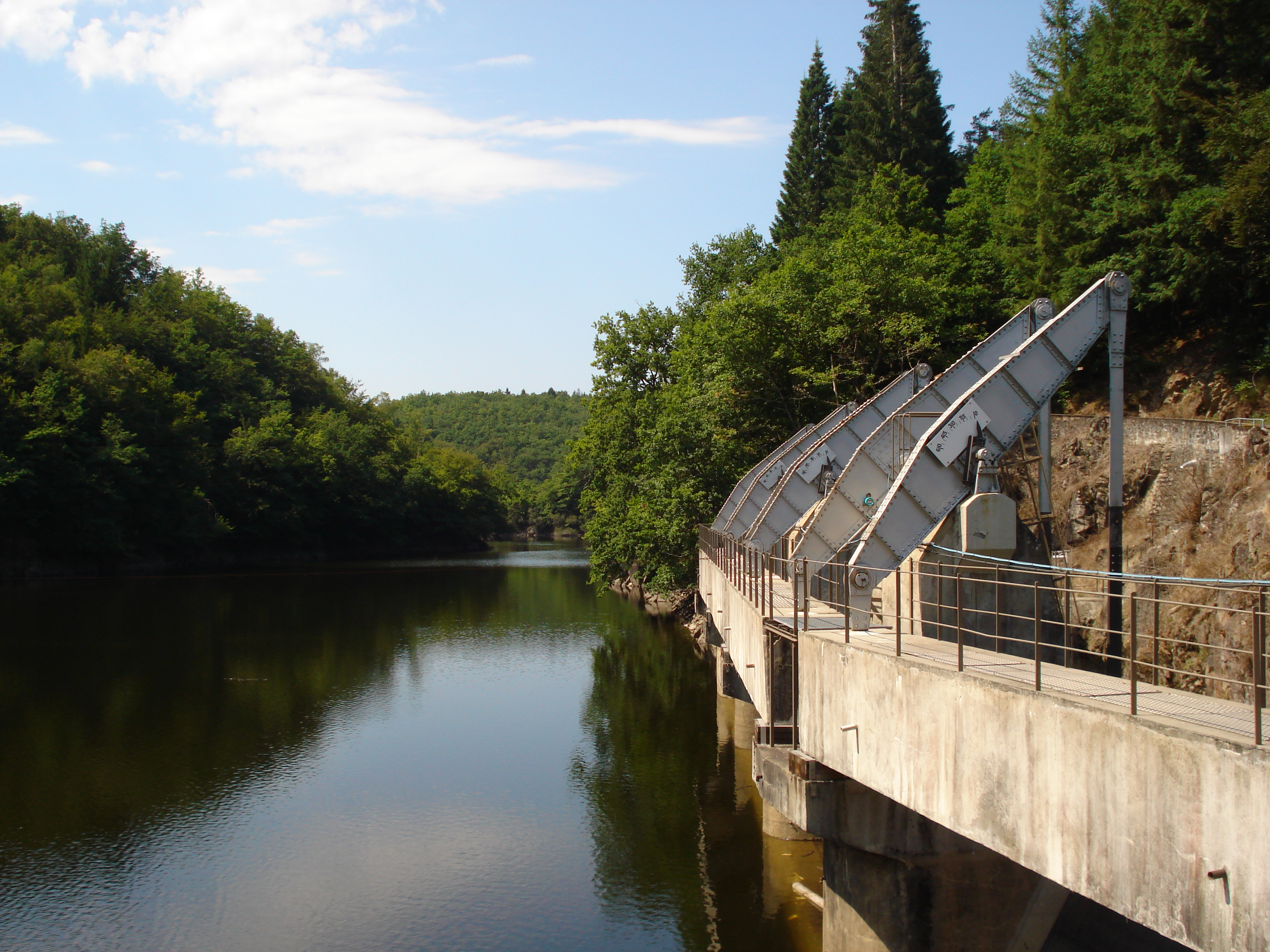

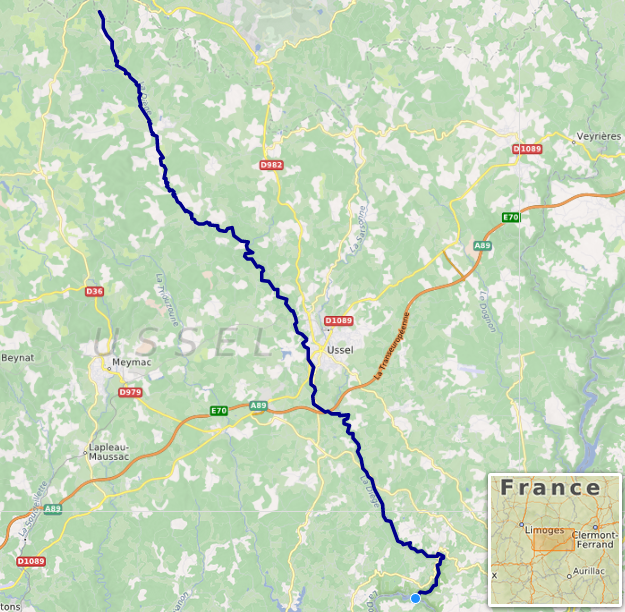

Location
- Country: France

Physical characteristics
- Source
  - location: Plateau de Millevaches
  - coordinates: 45°43′31″N 02°08′28″E
  - elevation: 770 m (2,530 ft)
- Mouth
  - location: Dordogne
  - coordinates: 45°24′51″N 02°22′52″E
  - elevation: 400 m (1,300 ft)
- Length: 54.4 km (33.8 mi)
- Basin size: 508 km^{2} (196 sq mi)
- Discharge
  - average: 12 m^{3}/s (420 cu ft/s)

Basin features
- Progression: Dordogne→ Gironde estuary→ Atlantic Ocean

The Diège (French pronunciation: [djɛʒ]; Occitan: Dieja) is a 54.4 km (33.8 mi) long river in the Corrèze département, south central France. Its source is at Saint-Setiers, on the plateau de Millevaches, in the parc naturel régional de Millevaches en Limousin. It flows generally southeast. It is a right tributary of the Dordogne into which it flows between Roche-le-Peyroux and Saint-Julien-près-Bort, 68 km (42 mi) southwest of Clermont-Ferrand.

Its main tributary is the Liège.

== Communes along its course ==
This list is ordered from source to mouth:

- Corrèze: Saint-Setiers, Sornac, Bellechassagne, Saint-Germain-Lavolps, Saint-Pardoux-le-Vieux, Chaveroche, Ussel, Mestes, Saint-Exupéry-les-Roches, Chirac-Bellevue, Saint-Victour, Margerides, Saint-Étienne-la-Geneste, Sainte-Marie-Lapanouze, Roche-le-Peyroux, Saint-Julien-près-Bort,
