= Chaveroche =

- Commune
- Coat of arms
- Location of Chaveroche
- Location within France Location within Nouvelle-Aquitaine
- Coordinates: 45°34′30″N 2°15′28″E
- Country: France
- Region: Nouvelle-Aquitaine
- Department: Corrèze
- Arrondissement: Ussel
- Canton: Plateau de Millevaches
- Intercommunality: Haute-Corrèze Communauté

Government
  - Mayor (2020–2026): Daniel Escurat
- Area^{1}: 18.26 km^{2} (7.05 sq mi)
- Highest elevation: 814 m (2,671 ft)
- Lowest elevation: 612 m (2,008 ft)
- Population (2023): 268
  - Density: 14.7/km^{2} (38.0/sq mi)
- Time zone: UTC+01:00 (CET)
  - Summer (DST): UTC+02:00 (CEST)
- INSEE/Postal code: 19053 /19200
- ^{1} French Land Register data, which excludes lakes, ponds, glaciers > 1 km^{2} (0.386 sq mi or 247 acres) and river estuaries.

Chaveroche (French pronunciation: [ʃavʁɔʃ]; Occitan: Chavaròcha) is a commune in the Corrèze department in central France.

== Geography ==
The river Diège forms most of the commune's eastern boundary.

== Population ==
Historical population
Year	Pop.	±% p.a.
1968	167	—
1975	139	−2.59%
1982	140	+0.10%
1990	149	+0.78%
1999	145	−0.30%
2007	199	+4.04%
2012	204	+0.50%
2017	233	+2.69%
2023	268	+2.36%
Source: INSEE

== See also ==
- Communes of the Corrèze department
