= Château de la Gane =

Castle in Nouvelle-Aquitaine, France

Coordinates: 45.4945°N 2.3740°E

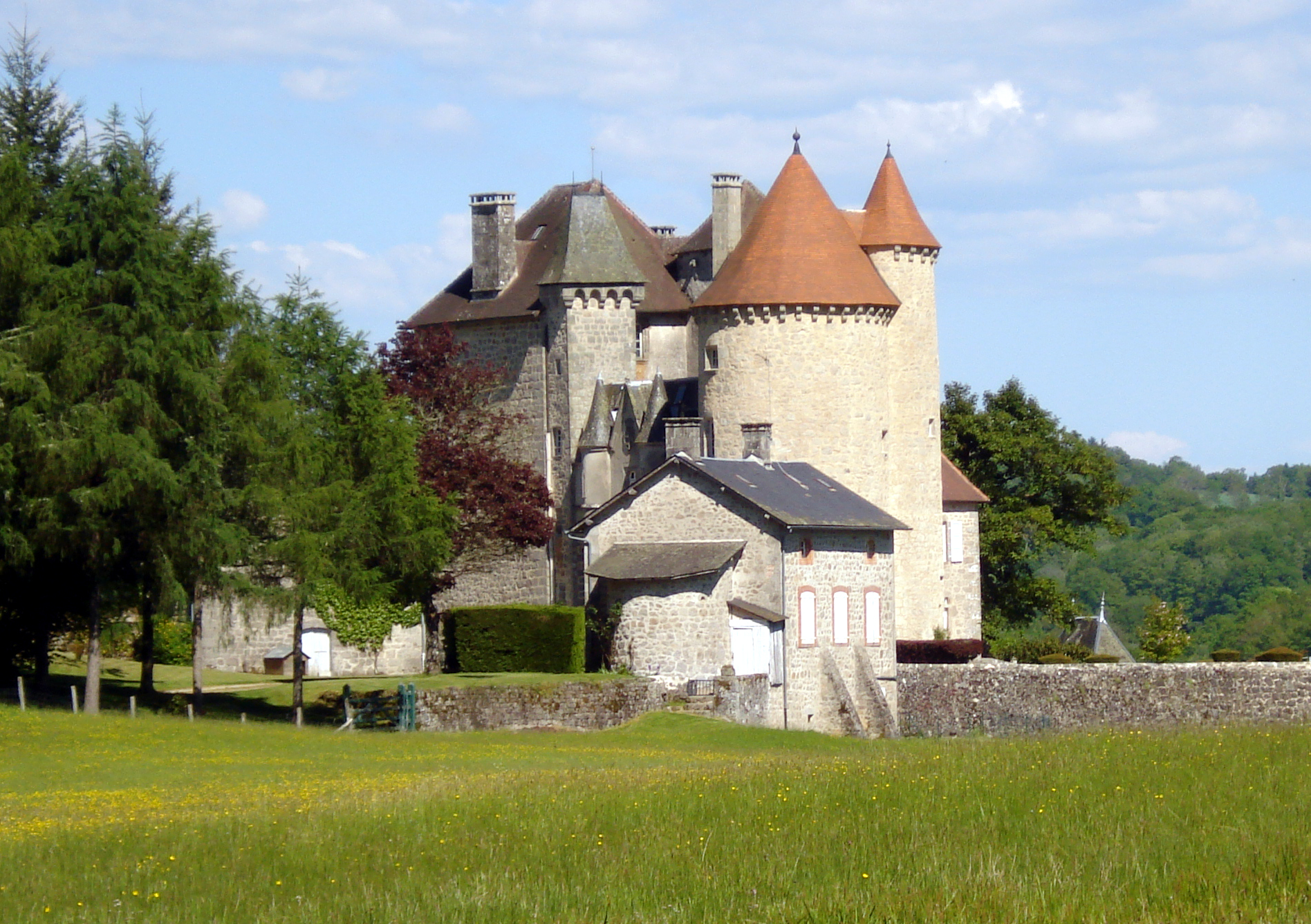
- Interactive map of the Château de la Gane area

The Château de la Gane is an historic castle in Saint-Exupéry-les-Roches, Corrèze, Nouvelle-Aquitaine, France.

== History ==
It was built in 1286 for Pierre-André de la Ganne. The western tower was built in the 15th or 16th century. It was inherited by Guillaume de La Brosse in 1432. In 1510, it was acquired by Antoine Andrieu, a bourgeois who married into the nobility and was subsequently ennobled.

In 1772, it was acquired by Jean-Joseph de Parel d'Espeiruc de la Chatonie. In 1804, it was acquired by Louis-Paul de Selve de Bity.

== Architectural significance ==
It has been listed as an official monument since 1980.
