= Bellechassagne =

- Commune
- Location of Bellechassagne
- Location within France Location within Nouvelle-Aquitaine
- Coordinates: 45°38′45″N 2°13′35″E
- Country: France
- Region: Nouvelle-Aquitaine
- Department: Corrèze
- Arrondissement: Ussel
- Canton: Plateau de Millevaches
- Intercommunality: Haute-Corrèze Communauté

Government
  - Mayor (2020–2026): Claude Bauvy
- Area^{1}: 13.34 km^{2} (5.15 sq mi)
- Highest elevation: 804 m (2,638 ft)
- Lowest elevation: 665 m (2,182 ft)
- Population (2023): 102
  - Density: 7.65/km^{2} (19.8/sq mi)
- Time zone: UTC+01:00 (CET)
  - Summer (DST): UTC+02:00 (CEST)
- INSEE/Postal code: 19021 /19290
- ^{1} French Land Register data, which excludes lakes, ponds, glaciers > 1 km^{2} (0.386 sq mi or 247 acres) and river estuaries.

Bellechassagne (French pronunciation: [bɛlʃasaɲ]; Occitan: Belachassanha) is a commune of the Corrèze department in central France.

== Geography ==
The river Diège forms part of the commune's western border.

== Population ==
Historical population
Year	Pop.	±% p.a.
1968	90	—
1975	90	+0.00%
1982	65	−4.54%
1990	72	+1.29%
1999	78	+0.89%
2007	73	−0.82%
2012	77	+1.07%
2017	89	+2.94%
2023	102	+2.30%
Source: INSEE

== See also ==
- Communes of the Corrèze department
