= Liginiac =

- Commune
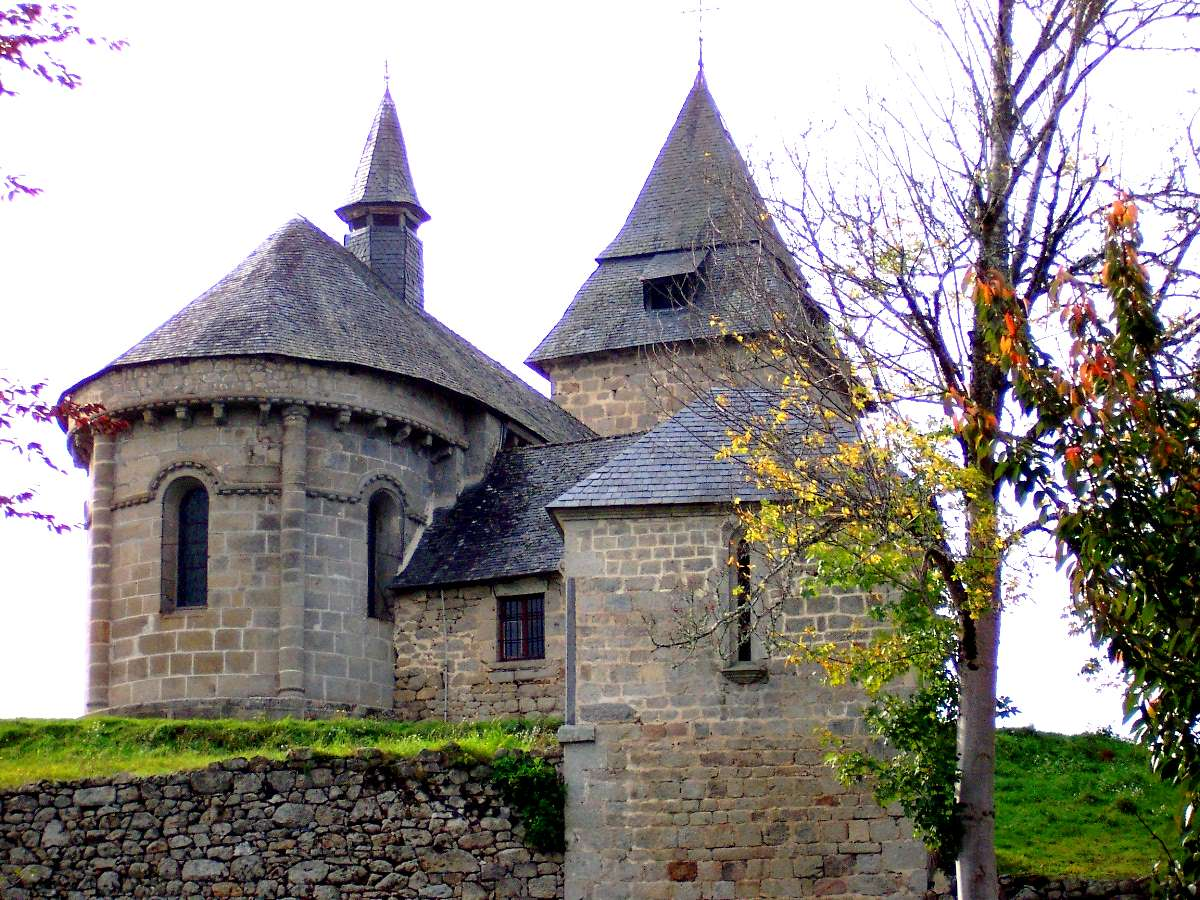
- The church in Liginiac

- Coat of arms
- Location of Liginiac
- Location within France Location within Nouvelle-Aquitaine
- Coordinates: 45°24′59″N 2°20′03″E
- Country: France
- Region: Nouvelle-Aquitaine
- Department: Corrèze
- Arrondissement: Ussel
- Canton: Haute-Dordogne
- Intercommunality: Haute-Corrèze Communauté

Government
  - Mayor (2020–2026): Frédéric Bivert
- Area^{1}: 28.53 km^{2} (11.02 sq mi)
- Highest elevation: 692 m (2,270 ft)
- Lowest elevation: 351 m (1,152 ft)
- Population (2023): 651
  - Density: 22.8/km^{2} (59.1/sq mi)
- Demonym(s): Liginiacois, Liginiacoises
- Time zone: UTC+01:00 (CET)
  - Summer (DST): UTC+02:00 (CEST)
- INSEE/Postal code: 19113 /19160
- ^{1} French Land Register data, which excludes lakes, ponds, glaciers > 1 km^{2} (0.386 sq mi or 247 acres) and river estuaries.

Liginiac (French pronunciation: [liʒinjak]; Occitan: Liginhac) is a commune in the Corrèze department in central France.

== Geography ==
The Triouzoune forms most of the commune's western boundary.

== Population ==
Historical population
Year	Pop.	±% p.a.
1968	725	—
1975	601	−2.64%
1982	618	+0.40%
1990	603	−0.31%
1999	630	+0.49%
2007	617	−0.26%
2012	618	+0.03%
2017	606	−0.39%
2023	651	+1.20%
Source: INSEE

== See also ==
- Communes of the Corrèze department
