= Saint-Exupéry-les-Roches =

- Commune
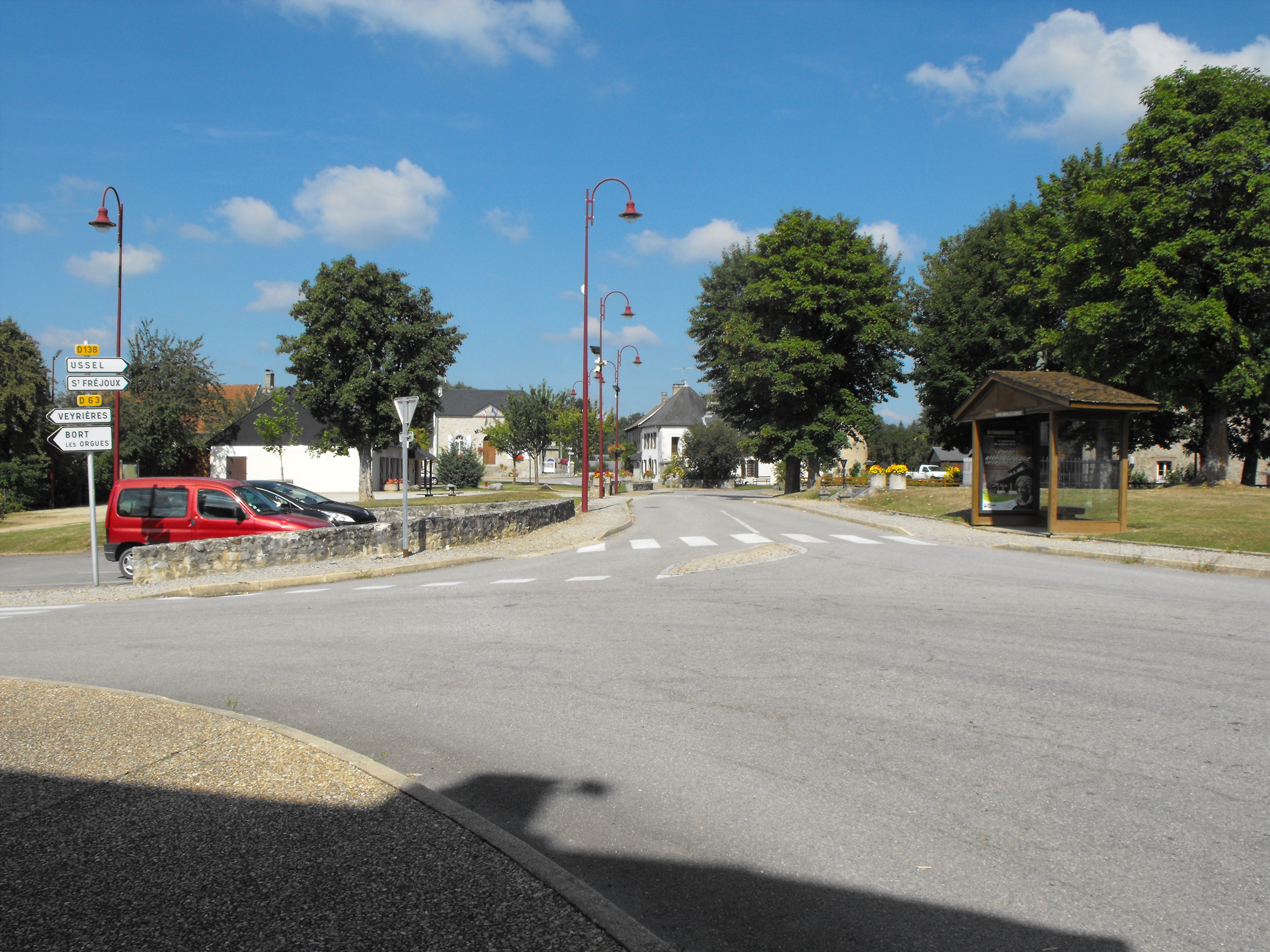
- The centre of Saint-Exupéry-les-Roches

- Coat of arms
- Location of Saint-Exupéry-les-Roches
- Location within France Location within Nouvelle-Aquitaine
- Coordinates: 45°30′58″N 2°22′11″E
- Country: France
- Region: Nouvelle-Aquitaine
- Department: Corrèze
- Arrondissement: Ussel
- Canton: Haute-Dordogne
- Intercommunality: Haute-Corrèze Communauté

Government
  - Mayor (2020–2026): Jean-Pierre Bodeveix
- Area^{1}: 37.00 km^{2} (14.29 sq mi)
- Elevation: 645 m (2,116 ft)
- Highest elevation: 760 m (2,490 ft)
- Lowest elevation: 545 m (1,788 ft)
- Population (2023): 591
  - Density: 16.0/km^{2} (41.4/sq mi)
- Time zone: UTC+01:00 (CET)
  - Summer (DST): UTC+02:00 (CEST)
- INSEE/Postal code: 19201 /19200
- ^{1} French Land Register data, which excludes lakes, ponds, glaciers > 1 km^{2} (0.386 sq mi or 247 acres) and river estuaries.

Saint-Exupéry-les-Roches (French pronunciation: [sɛ̃.t‿ɛksypeʁi le ʁɔʃ]; Auvergnat: Sent Sepieri lo Ròcas) is a commune in the Corrèze department in central France.

== Geography ==
The river Diège forms all of the commune's southwestern boundary.

== Population ==
Historical population
Year	Pop.	±% p.a.
1968	564	—
1975	509	−1.46%
1982	474	−1.01%
1990	515	+1.04%
1999	529	+0.30%
2007	526	−0.07%
2012	575	+1.80%
2017	596	+0.72%
2023	591	−0.14%
Source: INSEE

== See also ==
- Antoine de Chabannes
- Château de la Gane
- Communes of the Corrèze department
