= Chirac-Bellevue =

- Commune
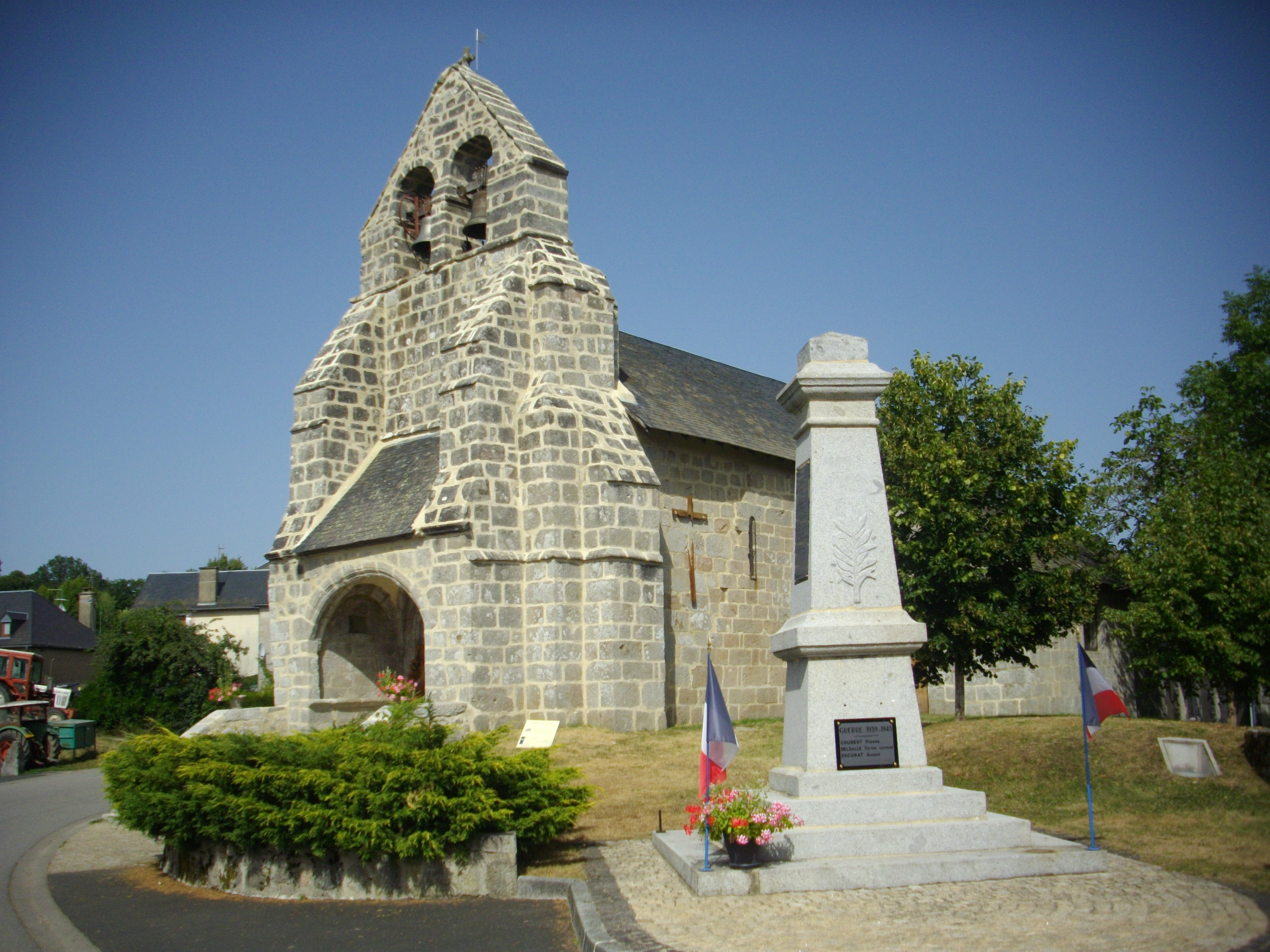
- The church in Chirac-Bellevue

- Coat of arms
- Location of Chirac-Bellevue
- Location within France Location within Nouvelle-Aquitaine
- Coordinates: 45°27′09″N 2°18′21″E
- Country: France
- Region: Nouvelle-Aquitaine
- Department: Corrèze
- Arrondissement: Ussel
- Canton: Haute-Dordogne
- Intercommunality: Haute-Corrèze Communauté

Government
  - Mayor (2020–2026): Robert Gantheil
- Area^{1}: 20.65 km^{2} (7.97 sq mi)
- Highest elevation: 691 m (2,267 ft)
- Lowest elevation: 545 m (1,788 ft)
- Population (2023): 272
  - Density: 13.2/km^{2} (34.1/sq mi)
- Time zone: UTC+01:00 (CET)
  - Summer (DST): UTC+02:00 (CEST)
- INSEE/Postal code: 19055 /19160
- ^{1} French Land Register data, which excludes lakes, ponds, glaciers > 1 km^{2} (0.386 sq mi or 247 acres) and river estuaries.

Chirac-Bellevue (French pronunciation: [ʃiʁak bɛlvy]; Occitan: Chirac) is a commune in the Corrèze department in central France.

== Geography ==
The river Diège forms all of the commune's eastern boundary.

== Population ==
Historical population
Year	Pop.	±% p.a.
1968	265	—
1975	230	−2.00%
1982	217	−0.83%
1990	191	−1.58%
1999	205	+0.79%
2007	259	+2.97%
2012	276	+1.28%
2017	294	+1.27%
2023	272	−1.29%
Source: INSEE

== See also ==
- Communes of the Corrèze department
