= Aix, Corrèze =

Aix
- Commune
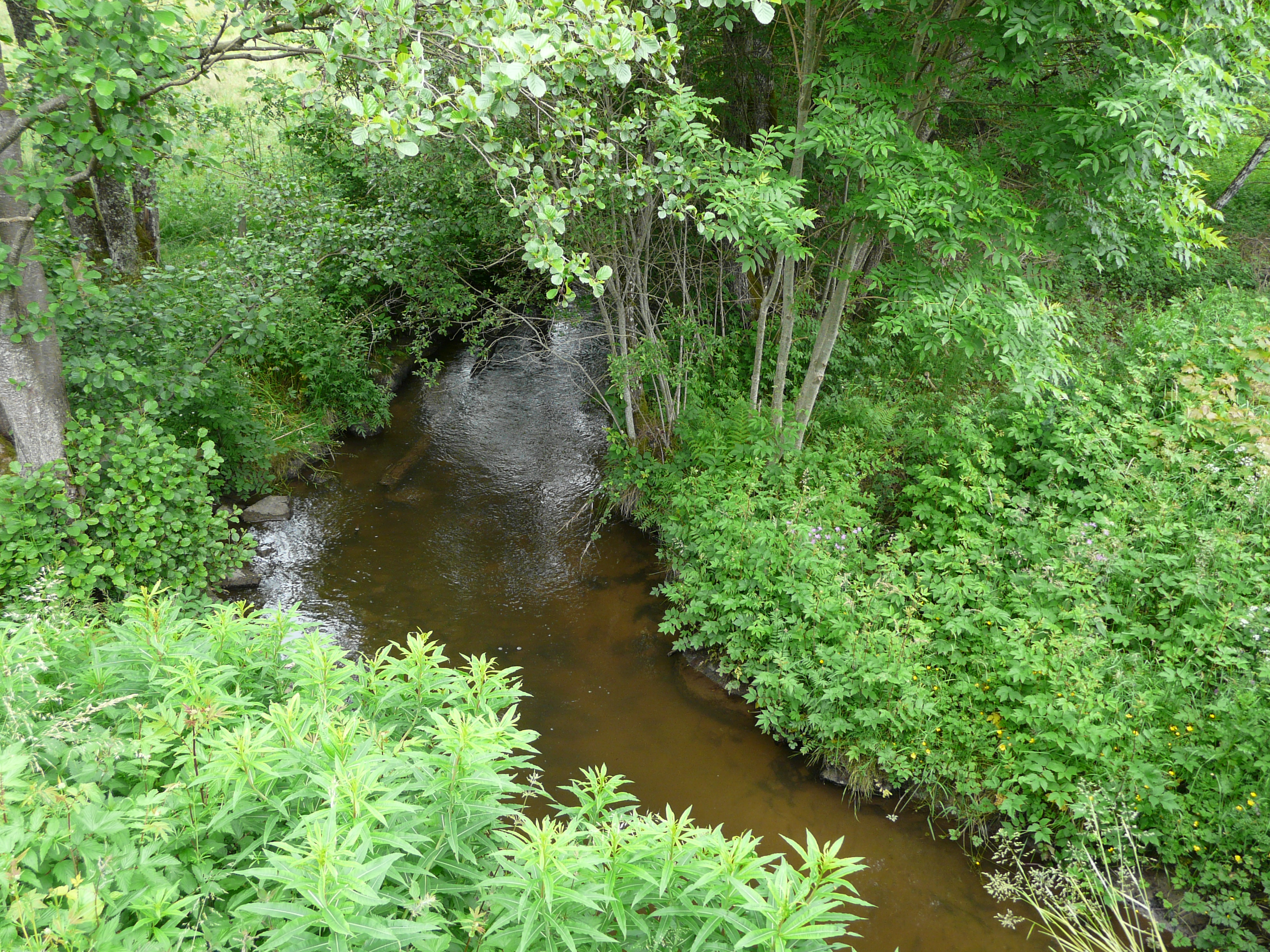
- The Barricade stream from Road D1089

- Coat of arms
- Location of Aix
- Location within France Location within Nouvelle-Aquitaine
- Coordinates: 45°37′01″N 2°23′00″E
- Country: France
- Region: Nouvelle-Aquitaine
- Department: Corrèze
- Arrondissement: Ussel
- Canton: Ussel
- Intercommunality: Haute-Corrèze Communauté

Government
  - Mayor (2020–2026): François Ratelade
- Area^{1}: 48.02 km^{2} (18.54 sq mi)
- Elevation: 850 m (2,790 ft)
- Highest elevation: 880 m (2,890 ft)
- Lowest elevation: 650 m (2,130 ft)
- Population (2023): 352
  - Density: 7.33/km^{2} (19.0/sq mi)
- Time zone: UTC+01:00 (CET)
  - Summer (DST): UTC+02:00 (CEST)
- INSEE/Postal code: 19002 /19200
- ^{1} French Land Register data, which excludes lakes, ponds, glaciers > 1 km^{2} (0.386 sq mi or 247 acres) and river estuaries.

Aix (French pronunciation: [ɛks]; Occitan: Ais) is a commune in the Corrèze department in the Nouvelle-Aquitaine region of central France.

== Geography ==
Aix is located some 50 km south-west of Clermont-Ferrand. The south eastern section of the commune is traversed by the TransEuroppienne Motorway (E70 / A89). Exit No. 24 is just next to the border and this exit to the north connects the motorway to the Highway D1089 which runs fairly parallel to the motorway from Ussel in the south-west to Merlines in the north-east passing through the heart of the commune. To reach the village of Aix it is possible to take the D40E2 which branches from the D1089 south-west of the commune and goes directly to the town. The town can also be accessed from the west on the D49 from Saint-Pardoux-le-Vieux which, after passing through the town, continues east to link with the D1089. There is also Highway D91 from the north as well as many small country roads.

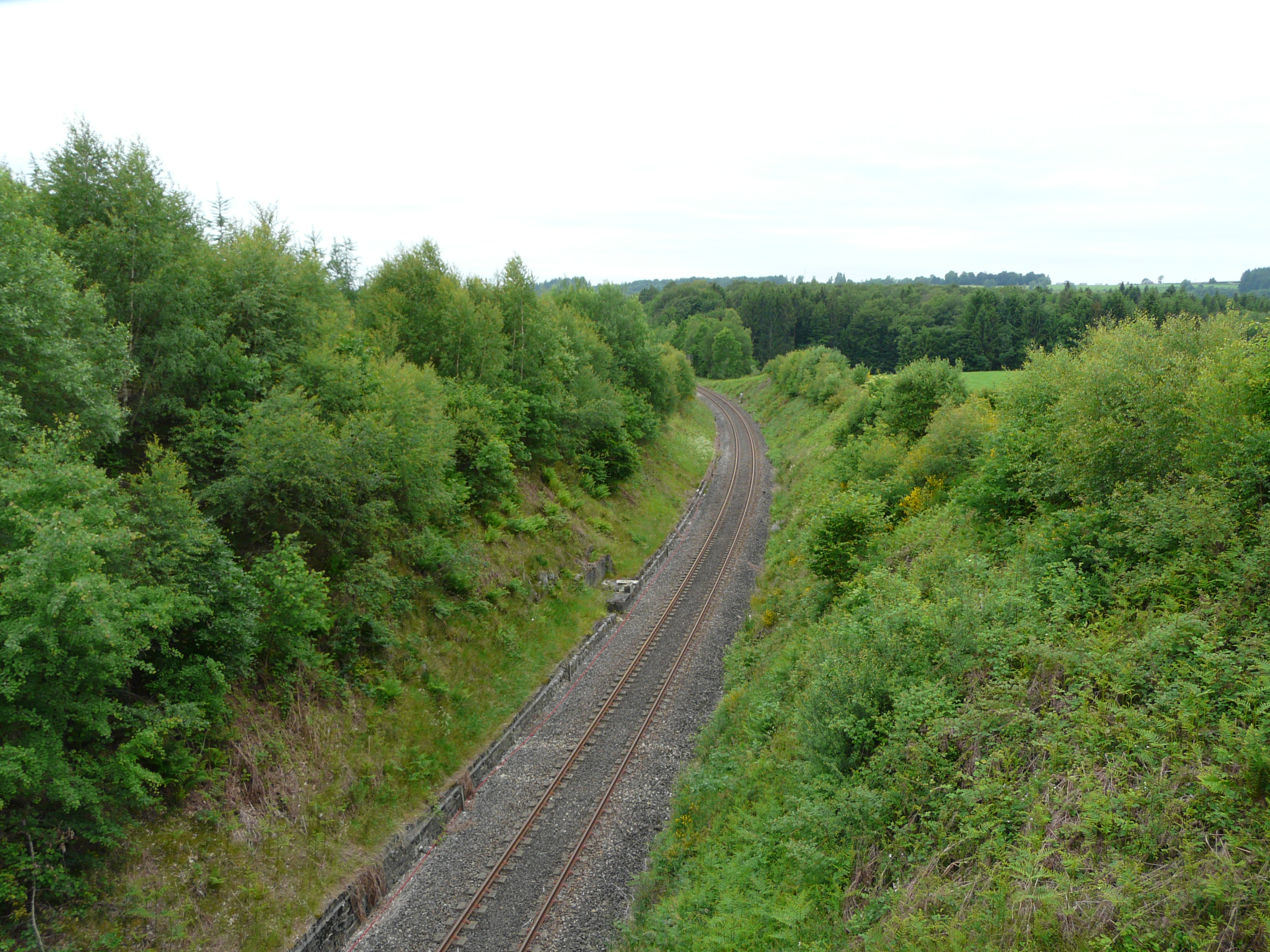
The railway at the Farget bridge on the D49

To the south-east of the town about 1.5 km in a direct line is the railway station of La Marsalouse which is served by TER Limousin and TER Auvergne trains which link Clermont-Ferrand to Gare de Limoges-Bénédictins and Gare de Brive-la-Gaillarde. TER buses also connect Aix and La Marsalouse to Ussel and Montluçon town, this route having been transferred to the road on 29 February 2008. There are many forests covering the commune with approximately 50% forest and 50% farmland.

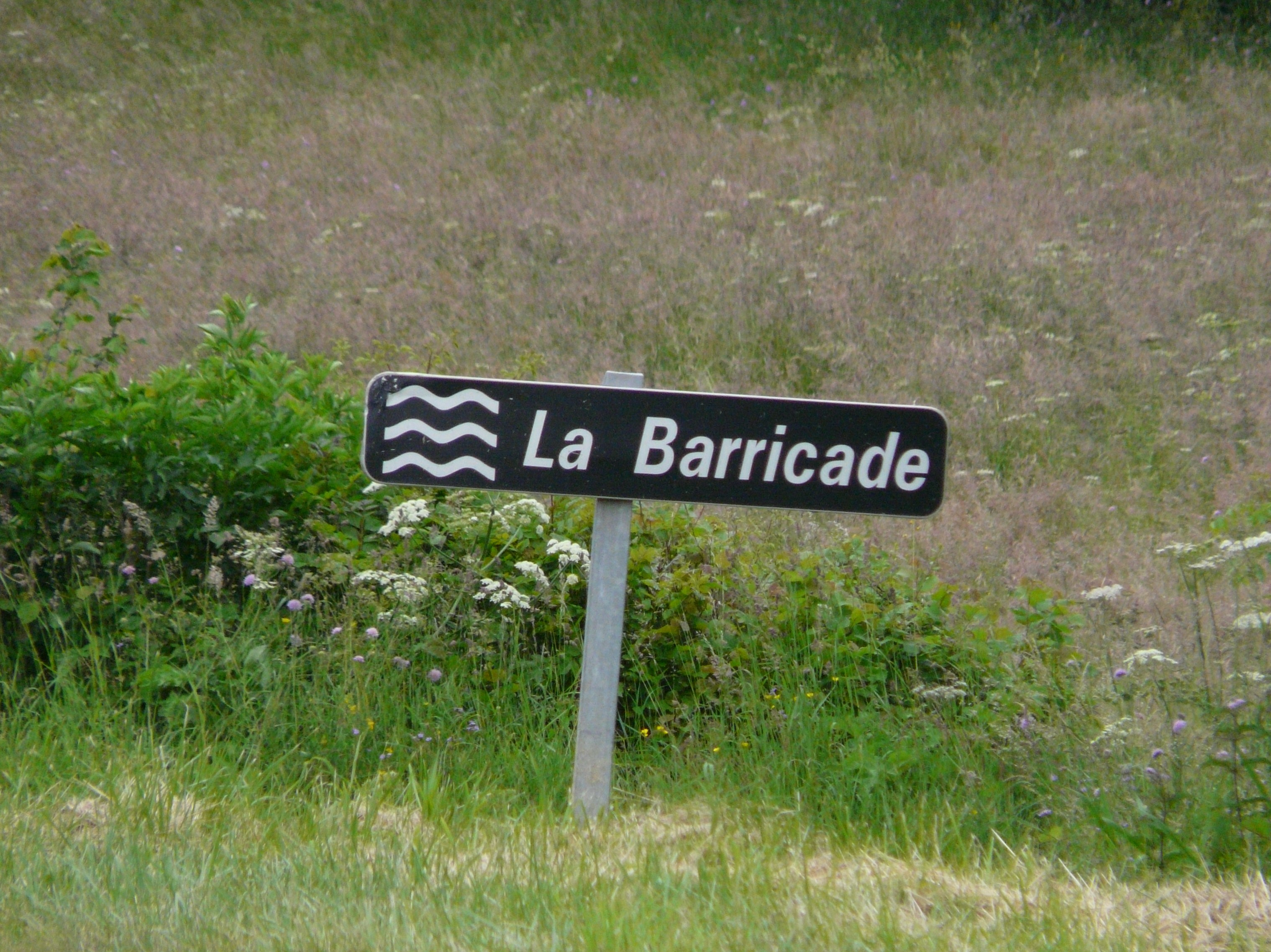
The Barricade stream at route D1089

The commune is covered by numerous streams including the Dozanne, the Sarsonne, the Dognon, the Jaloustre, the Barricade, and many others. Most of these flow into the Chavanon river which forms the border between the Correze and Puy-de-Dome departments in the south-east.

=== Heraldry ===
Arms of Aix	Blazon: Azure, a wolf passant of Or debruised by a quarter at sinister chief chequey in gules and Or.

== Administration ==
List of Successive Mayors of Aix

From	To	Name
1790		Mazel
1802	1813	F Mazel
1813	1831	A-F Mazel
1831	1848	A Clebert
1848	1850	P Dallet
1850	1854	P Sivace
1855	1860	L Moussard
1861	1865	P Majour
1865	1870	M Malpertu
1870	1871	E Lepeytre
1871	1873	P Dallet
1874	1876	F Baudry
1877	1878	P Dallet
1878	1886	A Tinlot
1886		J Malergue
2001	2014	Françoise Couzelas
2014	2026	François Ratelade

== Population ==
The inhabitants of the commune are known as Aixois or Aixoises in French.

Historical population
Year	Pop.	±% p.a.
1968	431	—
1975	373	−2.04%
1982	371	−0.08%
1990	325	−1.64%
1999	307	−0.63%
2007	380	+2.70%
2012	383	+0.16%
2017	392	+0.47%
2023	352	−1.78%
Source: INSEE

== Culture and heritage ==
=== Civil heritage ===
The commune has a number of buildings and structures that are registered as historical monuments:

- The War Memorial (1921)
- The Inn (1821)
- A Farmhouse at La Sauvette (18th century)
- A Farmhouse at La Navade (1866)
- A Farmhouse at Encogneras (1747)
- A Farmhouse / Mill at La Chassagnite (18th century), one of the few water mills in running condition.
- Farmhouses (17th-19th century)

Other sites of interest

- The Lyon-Bordeaux Roman Road visible between La Chassagnite and Aix railway station.
- A Feudal mound east of the town.
- Beautiful views of the Puy de Dome and Dore mountains (at the end of the village to the north on the D49).
- Hiking: the mail carrier path of 17 km with the departure point marked at the town hall. The Circuit de la Chassagnite (panel 13) of 13 km follows the Roman road. The Circuit Chamina 42 Roman road is 6 km with intermittent yellow signs.
- Mountain bike trail

=== Religious heritage ===
The commune has several religious buildings and structures that are registered as historical monuments:

- A Cemetery Cross (1888)
- A Cemetery (1888). The movable items in the cemetery have been registered as historical objects.
- The Parish Church of Saint Martin-de-Tours (13th century). The Church contains many items that are registered as historical objects:
  - 2 Bronze Bells (1871)
  - A Painting with frame: Calvary with Saint Madeleine (17th century)
  - A Sunburst Monstrance (19th century)
  - A Neo-gothic Chalice with Paten (19th century)
  - A Neo-gothic Chalice with Paten (19th century)
  - A Reliquary Cross (19th century)
  - A Sacristy Cross (17th century)
  - A Painting: The Calvary (17th century)
  - A Statue: Saint Martin-de-Tours (18th century)
  - A Statue: Virgin and child (18th century)
  - A Confessional (18th century)
  - 2 Statues: Saint Gervais and Saint Protais (17th century)
  - A Retable (17th century)
  - A Stained glass window: Virgin of the Nativity and Christ of the Eucharist (1891)
  - The Furniture in the Church

== See also ==
- Communes of the Corrèze department
