= Chavanon Viaduct =

Coordinates: 45°37′26″N 2°28′47″E

Le viaduc du Chavanon

The Chavanon Viaduct is a suspension bridge located in the Chavanon Valley in France connecting the towns of Merlines and Messeix. Opened for traffic in 2000, it has a main span of 300 metres (980 ft).

== See also ==
- List of bridges in France
