= 346 Hermentaria =

Main-belt asteroid

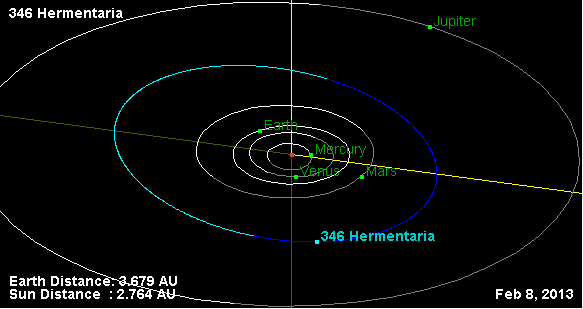
- Orbital diagram

Discovery
- Discovered by: Auguste Charlois
- Discovery date: 25 November 1892

Designations
- Pronunciation: /hɜːrmənˈtɛəriə/
- Named after: Herment
- Alternative designations: 1892 P
- Minor planet category: Main belt

Orbital characteristics
- Epoch 31 July 2016 (JD 2457600.5)
- Uncertainty parameter 0
- Observation arc: 123.38 yr (45,066 d)
- Aphelion: 3.08 AU (460.65 Gm)
- Perihelion: 2.51 AU (376.15 Gm)
- Semi-major axis: 2.80 AU (418.40 Gm)
- Eccentricity: 0.10098
- Orbital period (sidereal): 4.68 yr (1,708.5 d)
- Mean anomaly: 188.671°
- Mean motion: 0° 12^{m} 38.578^{s} / day
- Inclination: 8.74967°
- Longitude of ascending node: 91.9628°
- Argument of perihelion: 292.035°

Physical characteristics
- Dimensions: 93.27±3.05 km (composite estimate); 106.52±2.2 km
- Mass: (1.12±0.19)×10^{18} kg (Note: Calculated from its standard gravitational parameter GM = 0.075±0.013 km^{3}/s^{2}.)
- Mean density: 3.32 g/cm^{3} (Note: Assuming a diameter of 86.4 km.)
- Synodic rotation period: 28.43 h (1.18 d); 17.790 h (0.74 d); 28.523 h (1.19 d)
- Geometric albedo: 0.2189±0.009
- Spectral type: S
- Absolute magnitude (H): 7.13

346 Hermentaria is a very large main-belt asteroid. It was discovered by French astronomer Auguste Charlois on 25 November 1892, in Nice. It is probably named for the town of Herment in the region of Auvergne, France. The asteroid orbits the Sun with a period of 4.68 years and an eccentricity (ovalness) of 0.10. The orbital plane is inclined by 8.7° to the plane of the ecliptic.

This body has a rotational period of 28.523±0.001 h during which it varies in brightness with an amplitude of 0.14±0.01 magnitude. It has a cross-section diameter of ~100 km. 346 Hermentaria is classified as a (stony) S-type asteroid, indicating a siliceous mineralogical composition. The near infrared spectra of this object show absorption features that suggest a mix of the minerals clinopyroxene and orthopyroxene. It may be thermally–evolved, having at least partially melted at some point. The overall shape resembles a prolate spheroid.
