= Savennes =

Savennes may refer to the following places in France:

- Savennes, Creuse, a commune in the Creuse department
- Savennes, Puy-de-Dôme, a commune in the Puy-de-Dôme department
