= Saint-Germain-près-Herment =

- Commune
- Coat of arms
- Location of Saint-Germain-près-Herment
- Location within France Location within Auvergne-Rhône-Alpes
- Coordinates: 45°43′52″N 2°32′38″E
- Country: France
- Region: Auvergne-Rhône-Alpes
- Department: Puy-de-Dôme
- Arrondissement: Riom
- Canton: Saint-Ours
- Intercommunality: Chavanon Combrailles et Volcans

Government
  - Mayor (2026–32): Nicolas Donnat
- Area^{1}: 16.82 km^{2} (6.49 sq mi)
- Elevation: 750 m (2,460 ft)
- Highest elevation: 784 m (2,572 ft)
- Lowest elevation: 670 m (2,200 ft)
- Population (2023): 60
  - Density: 3.6/km^{2} (9.2/sq mi)
- Time zone: UTC+01:00 (CET)
  - Summer (DST): UTC+02:00 (CEST)
- INSEE/Postal code: 63351 /63470
- ^{1} French Land Register data, which excludes lakes, ponds, glaciers > 1 km^{2} (0.386 sq mi or 247 acres) and river estuaries.

Saint-Germain-près-Herment (French pronunciation: [sɛ̃ ʒɛʁmɛ̃ pʁɛ ɛʁmɑ̃], literally Saint-Germain near Herment; Occitan: Sent German de Herment) is a commune in the Puy-de-Dôme department in Auvergne in central France.

== Geography ==
The Chavanon forms part of the commune's south-western border.

== See also ==
- Communes of the Puy-de-Dôme department
