= Saint-Pardoux-le-Neuf =

Saint-Pardoux-le-Neuf may refer to the following places in France:

- Saint-Pardoux-le-Neuf, Corrèze, a commune in the department of Corrèze
- Saint-Pardoux-le-Neuf, Creuse, a commune in the department of Creuse
