= Lastic, Puy-de-Dôme =

Lastic
- Commune
- Location of Lastic
- Location within France Location within Auvergne-Rhône-Alpes
- Coordinates: 45°42′40″N 2°34′08″E
- Country: France
- Region: Auvergne-Rhône-Alpes
- Department: Puy-de-Dôme
- Arrondissement: Riom
- Canton: Saint-Ours
- Intercommunality: CC Chavanon Combrailles et Volcans

Government
  - Mayor (2026–32): Mireille Mailhot
- Area^{1}: 17.31 km^{2} (6.68 sq mi)
- Elevation: 740 m (2,430 ft)
- Highest elevation: 865 m (2,838 ft)
- Lowest elevation: 700 m (2,300 ft)
- Population (2023): 98
  - Density: 5.7/km^{2} (15/sq mi)
- Time zone: UTC+01:00 (CET)
  - Summer (DST): UTC+02:00 (CEST)
- INSEE/Postal code: 63191 /63760
- ^{1} French Land Register data, which excludes lakes, ponds, glaciers > 1 km^{2} (0.386 sq mi or 247 acres) and river estuaries.

Lastic (French pronunciation: [lastik]) is a commune in the Puy-de-Dôme department in Auvergne in central France.

== See also ==
- Communes of the Puy-de-Dôme department
