= La Goutelle =

- Commune
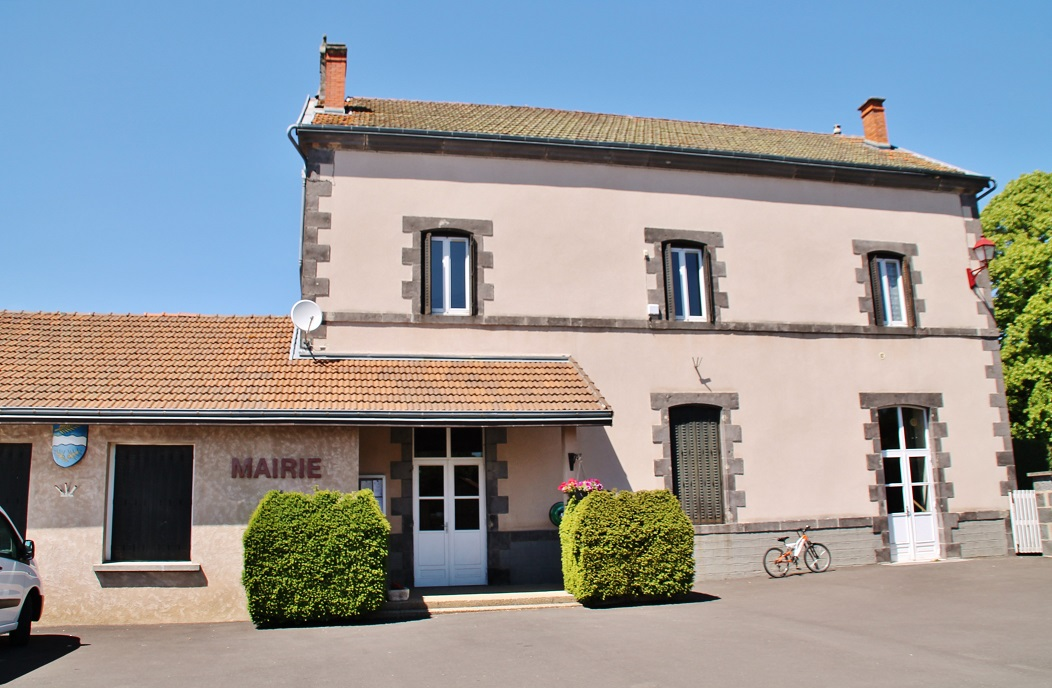
- The town hall in La Goutelle

- Coat of arms
- Location of La Goutelle
- Location within France Location within Auvergne-Rhône-Alpes
- Coordinates: 45°50′32″N 2°45′33″E
- Country: France
- Region: Auvergne-Rhône-Alpes
- Department: Puy-de-Dôme
- Arrondissement: Riom
- Canton: Saint-Ours
- Intercommunality: Chavanon Combrailles et Volcans

Government
  - Mayor (2020–2026): Frédéric Saby
- Area^{1}: 24.25 km^{2} (9.36 sq mi)
- Highest elevation: 884 m (2,900 ft)
- Lowest elevation: 612 m (2,008 ft)
- Population (2023): 609
  - Density: 25.1/km^{2} (65.0/sq mi)
- Time zone: UTC+01:00 (CET)
  - Summer (DST): UTC+02:00 (CEST)
- INSEE/Postal code: 63170 /63230
- ^{1} French Land Register data, which excludes lakes, ponds, glaciers > 1 km^{2} (0.386 sq mi or 247 acres) and river estuaries.

La Goutelle (French pronunciation: [la ɡutɛl]; Occitan: La Gotèla) is a commune in the Puy-de-Dôme department in Auvergne in central France.

== Geography ==
La Goutelle is situated some 30 km west of Clermont Ferrand, on the old N141 running from Royan on the Atlantic coast all the way across France. The road, now renamed the D941, has lost its national importance but still remains the principal route linking Clermont Ferrand to Limoges.

== Economy ==
La Goutelle is part of the canton of Pontgibaud, and like Pontgibaud relied on mining as its major source of income until the early 20th Century. Nowadays milk production, forestry, passing trade for its bars and restaurants and the export of labour to Clermont Ferrand and the Ancizes form La Goutelle's economy. La Goutelle has managed to retain several shops, bars and restaurants and has a regionally renowned boulangerie. La Goutelle has a municipal campsite though it only tends to be occupied in the weeks surrounding the Fête Patronale.

== Population ==
The 2010 census reported a population of 610 inhabitants in La Goutelle (with 520 registered voters, not all full-time residents). More than 20 of La Goutelle's constituent "villages" are inhabited. Le Bourg has around 250 inhabitants. Ossebet, Ballot, Salmondeche are the larger outlying villages.

== Culture ==
It shares primary school services with neighbouring St. Jacques d'Ambur and has joined the "communité de communes" Pontgibaud, Sioule & Volcans in 2010. Its football team is currently incorporated into Association Sportive Pontgibaud - La Goutelle. Although all home games are played at La Goutelle, the last Goutellois player left the club in 2007. ASPLG went into "sommeil" ("sleep" - a temporary suspension) at the end of the 2009/2010 season. In common with most of the villages of the Combrailles, there is an active Comité des Fetes which amongst other responsibilities, runs the Fete Patronale - always the first weekend of August (2010, 30 July to 2 August).

== Administration ==
Since 2014 the mayor of La Goutelle is Frédéric Saby, who was re-elected in 2020.

== See also ==
- Communes of the Puy-de-Dôme department
