= Canton of Saint-Ours =

Coordinates: 45.85°N 2.89°E

The canton of Saint-Ours is an administrative division of the Puy-de-Dôme department, central France. It was created at the French canton reorganisation which came into effect in March 2015. Its seat is in Saint-Ours.

It consists of the following communes:

1. Bourg-Lastic
2. Briffons
3. Bromont-Lamothe
4. La Celle
5. Chapdes-Beaufort
6. Charbonnières-les-Varennes
7. Cisternes-la-Forêt
8. Combrailles
9. Condat-en-Combraille
10. Fernoël
11. Giat
12. La Goutelle
13. Herment
14. Landogne
15. Lastic
16. Messeix
17. Miremont
18. Montel-de-Gelat
19. Montfermy
20. Pontaumur
21. Pontgibaud
22. Prondines
23. Pulvérières
24. Puy-Saint-Gulmier
25. Saint-Avit
26. Saint-Étienne-des-Champs
27. Saint-Germain-près-Herment
28. Saint-Hilaire-les-Monges
29. Saint-Jacques-d'Ambur
30. Saint-Julien-Puy-Lavèze
31. Saint-Ours
32. Saint-Pierre-le-Chastel
33. Saint-Sulpice
34. Sauvagnat
35. Savennes
36. Tortebesse
37. Tralaigues
38. Verneugheol
39. Villossanges
40. Voingt
