= Montfermy =

- Commune
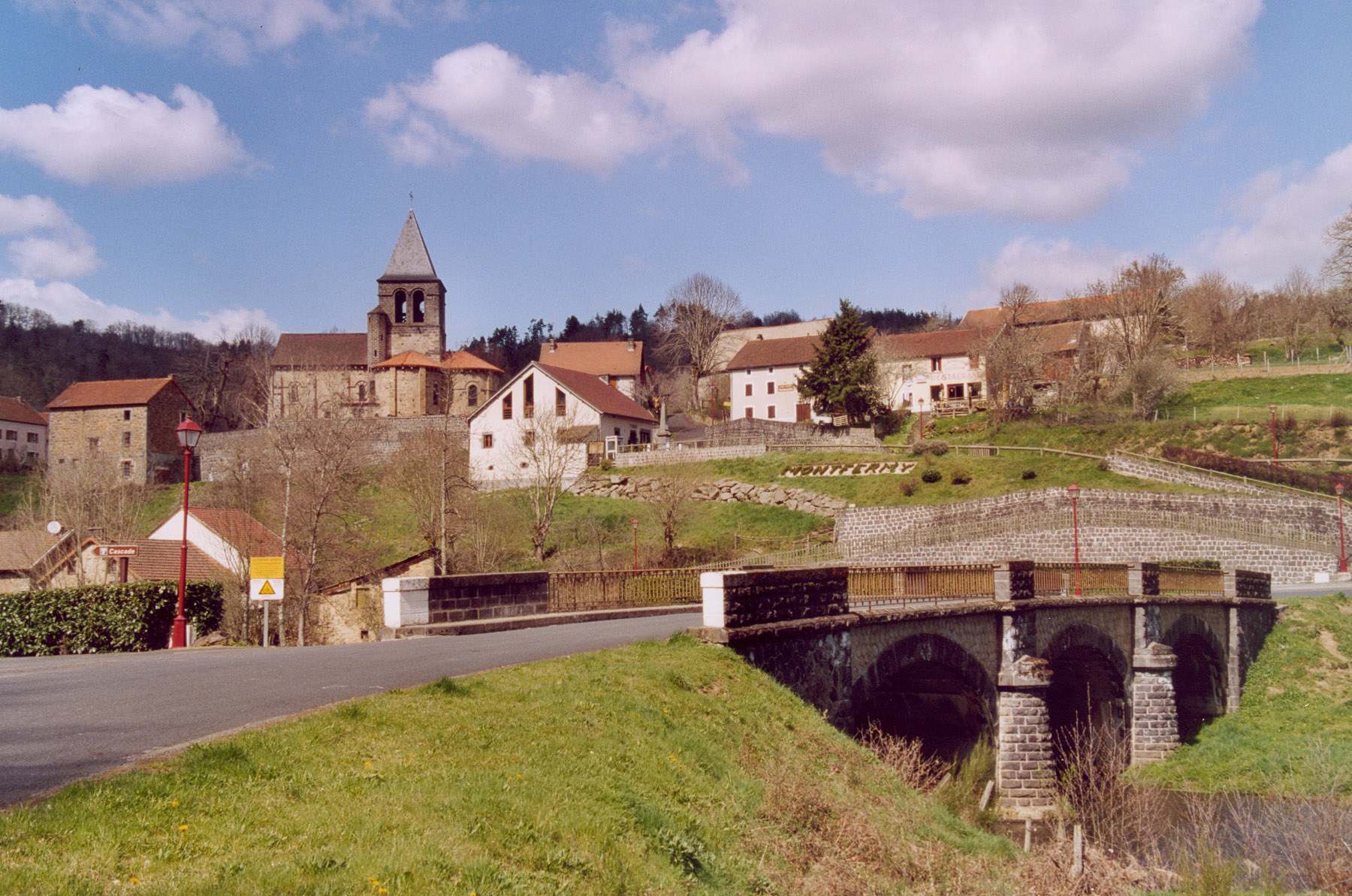
- A general view of Montfermy

- Coat of arms
- Location of Montfermy
- Location within France Location within Auvergne-Rhône-Alpes
- Coordinates: 45°52′52″N 2°48′38″E
- Country: France
- Region: Auvergne-Rhône-Alpes
- Department: Puy-de-Dôme
- Arrondissement: Riom
- Canton: Saint-Ours

Government
  - Mayor (2020–2026): Vladimir Longchambon
- Area^{1}: 14.25 km^{2} (5.50 sq mi)
- Highest elevation: 771 m (2,530 ft)
- Lowest elevation: 530 m (1,740 ft)
- Population (2023): 225
  - Density: 15.8/km^{2} (40.9/sq mi)
- Time zone: UTC+01:00 (CET)
  - Summer (DST): UTC+02:00 (CEST)
- INSEE/Postal code: 63238 /63230
- ^{1} French Land Register data, which excludes lakes, ponds, glaciers > 1 km^{2} (0.386 sq mi or 247 acres) and river estuaries.

Montfermy (French pronunciation: [mɔ̃fɛʁmi]; Occitan: Montferm) is a commune in the Puy-de-Dôme department in Auvergne in central France.

== See also ==
- Communes of the Puy-de-Dôme department
