= Monestier-Merlines =

- Commune
- Coat of arms
- Location of Monestier-Merlines
- Location within France Location within Nouvelle-Aquitaine
- Coordinates: 45°39′38″N 2°29′58″E
- Country: France
- Region: Nouvelle-Aquitaine
- Department: Corrèze
- Arrondissement: Ussel
- Canton: Ussel
- Intercommunality: Haute-Corrèze Communauté

Government
  - Mayor (2020–2026): Nathalie Le Gall
- Area^{1}: 9.48 km^{2} (3.66 sq mi)
- Highest elevation: 774 m (2,539 ft)
- Lowest elevation: 614 m (2,014 ft)
- Population (2023): 302
  - Density: 31.9/km^{2} (82.5/sq mi)
- Time zone: UTC+01:00 (CET)
  - Summer (DST): UTC+02:00 (CEST)
- INSEE/Postal code: 19141 /19340
- ^{1} French Land Register data, which excludes lakes, ponds, glaciers > 1 km^{2} (0.386 sq mi or 247 acres) and river estuaries.

Monestier-Merlines (French pronunciation: [mɔnɛstje mɛʁlin]; Occitan: Monestièr e Merlinas) is a commune in the Corrèze department in central France.

== Geography ==
The Chavanon forms the commune's southeastern boundary.

== Population ==
Historical population
Year	Pop.	±% p.a.
1968	887	—
1975	830	−0.94%
1982	693	−2.54%
1990	515	−3.64%
1999	342	−4.45%
2007	314	−1.06%
2012	317	+0.19%
2017	299	−1.16%
2023	302	+0.17%
Source: INSEE

== See also ==
- Communes of the Corrèze department
