= Verneugheol =

- Commune
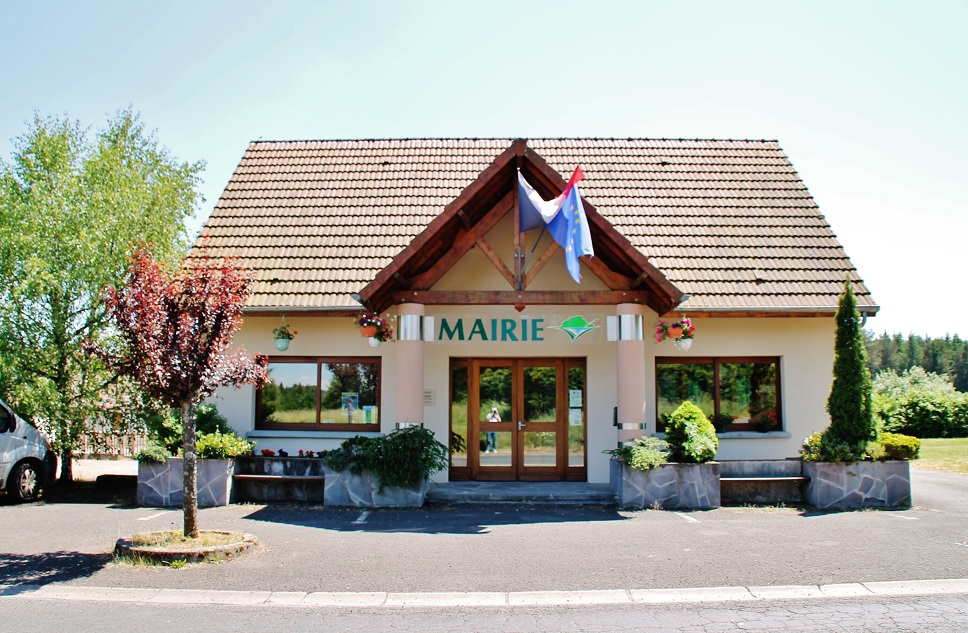
- The town hall in Verneugheol
- Location of Verneugheol
- Location within France Location within Auvergne-Rhône-Alpes
- Coordinates: 45°46′10″N 2°32′13″E
- Country: France
- Region: Auvergne-Rhône-Alpes
- Department: Puy-de-Dôme
- Arrondissement: Riom
- Canton: Saint-Ours
- Intercommunality: Chavanon Combrailles et Volcans

Government
  - Mayor (2020–2026): Bernard Thomas
- Area^{1}: 34.14 km^{2} (13.18 sq mi)
- Elevation: 727 m (2,385 ft)
- Highest elevation: 774 m (2,539 ft)
- Lowest elevation: 671 m (2,201 ft)
- Population (2023): 225
  - Density: 6.59/km^{2} (17.1/sq mi)
- Time zone: UTC+01:00 (CET)
  - Summer (DST): UTC+02:00 (CEST)
- INSEE/Postal code: 63450 /63470
- ^{1} French Land Register data, which excludes lakes, ponds, glaciers > 1 km^{2} (0.386 sq mi or 247 acres) and river estuaries.

Verneugheol (French pronunciation: [vɛʁnœʒɔl]; Occitan: Vernuèjols) is a commune in the Puy-de-Dôme department in Auvergne in central France.

== Geography ==
The Chavanon (locally called la Ramade) forms most of the commune's south-western border.

== See also ==
- Communes of the Puy-de-Dôme department
