= Prondines =

- Commune
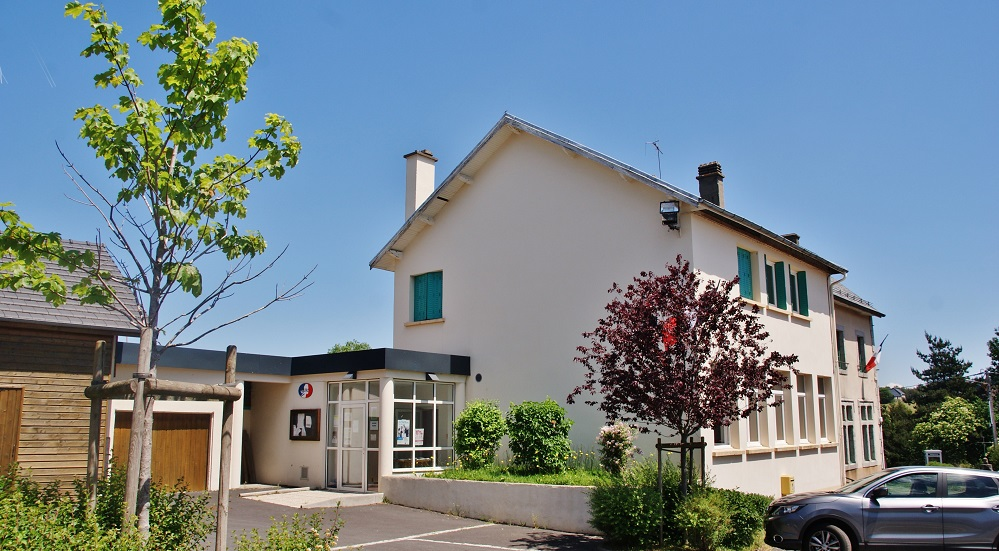
- The town hall in Prondines
- Location of Prondines
- Location within France Location within Auvergne-Rhône-Alpes
- Coordinates: 45°45′36″N 2°40′37″E
- Country: France
- Region: Auvergne-Rhône-Alpes
- Department: Puy-de-Dôme
- Arrondissement: Riom
- Canton: Saint-Ours
- Intercommunality: Chavanon Combrailles et Volcans

Government
  - Mayor (2026–32): Sébastien Monneron
- Area^{1}: 30.91 km^{2} (11.93 sq mi)
- Elevation: 850 m (2,790 ft)
- Highest elevation: 1,012 m (3,320 ft)
- Lowest elevation: 757 m (2,484 ft)
- Population (2023): 272
  - Density: 8.80/km^{2} (22.8/sq mi)
- Time zone: UTC+01:00 (CET)
  - Summer (DST): UTC+02:00 (CEST)
- INSEE/Postal code: 63289 /63470
- ^{1} French Land Register data, which excludes lakes, ponds, glaciers > 1 km^{2} (0.386 sq mi or 247 acres) and river estuaries.

Prondines (French pronunciation: [pʁɔ̃din]) is a commune in the Puy-de-Dôme department in Auvergne-Rhône-Alpes in central France.

== See also ==
- Communes of the Puy-de-Dôme department
