= Tortebesse =

- Commune
- Location of Tortebesse
- Location within France Location within Auvergne-Rhône-Alpes
- Coordinates: 45°43′55″N 2°39′07″E
- Country: France
- Region: Auvergne-Rhône-Alpes
- Department: Puy-de-Dôme
- Arrondissement: Riom
- Canton: Saint-Ours
- Intercommunality: CC Chavanon Combrailles et Volcans

Government
  - Mayor (2026–32): Yannick Bony
- Area^{1}: 11.64 km^{2} (4.49 sq mi)
- Highest elevation: 987 m (3,238 ft)
- Lowest elevation: 777 m (2,549 ft)
- Population (2023): 80
  - Density: 6.9/km^{2} (18/sq mi)
- Time zone: UTC+01:00 (CET)
  - Summer (DST): UTC+02:00 (CEST)
- INSEE/Postal code: 63433 /63470
- ^{1} French Land Register data, which excludes lakes, ponds, glaciers > 1 km^{2} (0.386 sq mi or 247 acres) and river estuaries.

Tortebesse (French pronunciation: [tɔʁtəbɛs]) is a commune in the Puy-de-Dôme department in Auvergne in central France.

Since 2026, a large wind farm called Eoliennes de Tortebesse is connected to the grid. There are 15 Vestas V110 wind turbines with a total capacity of 32.4 MW. An annual output of approximately 78 GWh is expected.

== See also ==
- Communes of the Puy-de-Dôme department
