= Confolent-Port-Dieu =

- Commune
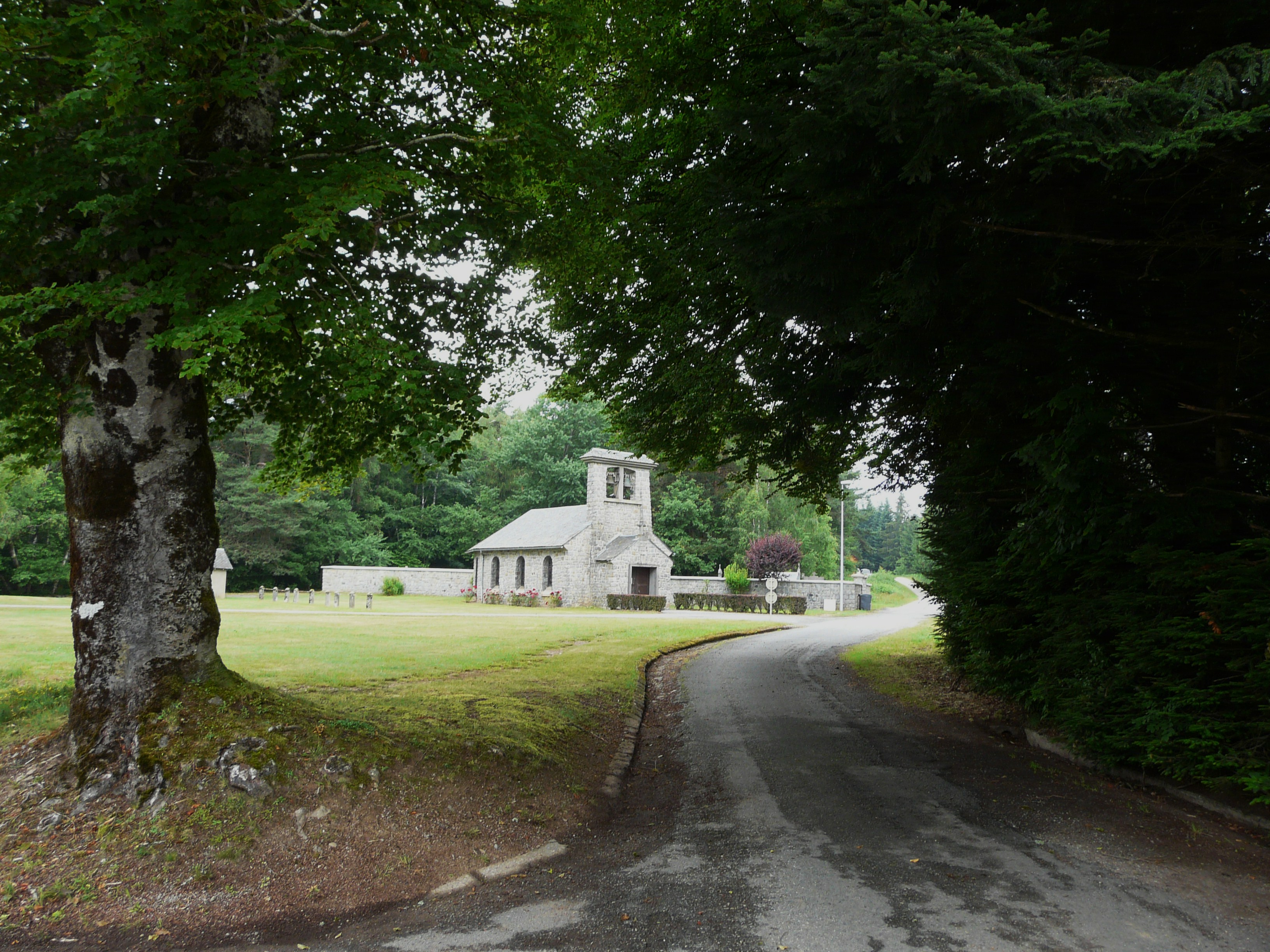
- The church in Confolent-Port-Dieu

- Coat of arms
- Location of Confolent-Port-Dieu
- Location within France Location within Nouvelle-Aquitaine
- Coordinates: 45°32′39″N 2°29′50″E
- Country: France
- Region: Nouvelle-Aquitaine
- Department: Corrèze
- Arrondissement: Ussel
- Canton: Haute-Dordogne
- Intercommunality: Haute-Corrèze Communauté

Government
  - Mayor (2020–2026): Nicolas Jouve
- Area^{1}: 8.47 km^{2} (3.27 sq mi)
- Highest elevation: 786 m (2,579 ft)
- Lowest elevation: 520 m (1,710 ft)
- Population (2023): 42
  - Density: 5.0/km^{2} (13/sq mi)
- Time zone: UTC+01:00 (CET)
  - Summer (DST): UTC+02:00 (CEST)
- INSEE/Postal code: 19167 /19200
- ^{1} French Land Register data, which excludes lakes, ponds, glaciers > 1 km^{2} (0.386 sq mi or 247 acres) and river estuaries.

Confolent-Port-Dieu (French pronunciation: [kɔ̃fɔlɑ̃ pɔʁ djø]; Occitan: Confolens Port Diu) is a commune in the Corrèze department in central France.

== Geography ==
The Chavanon forms the commune's northeastern boundary, then flows into the Dordogne, which forms the commune's eastern boundary.

== Population ==
Historical population
Year	Pop.	±% p.a.
1968	57	—
1975	40	−4.93%
1982	30	−4.03%
1990	38	+3.00%
1999	39	+0.29%
2007	29	−3.64%
2012	30	+0.68%
2017	40	+5.92%
2023	42	+0.82%
Source: INSEE

== See also ==
- Communes of the Corrèze department
