= Courteix =

- Commune
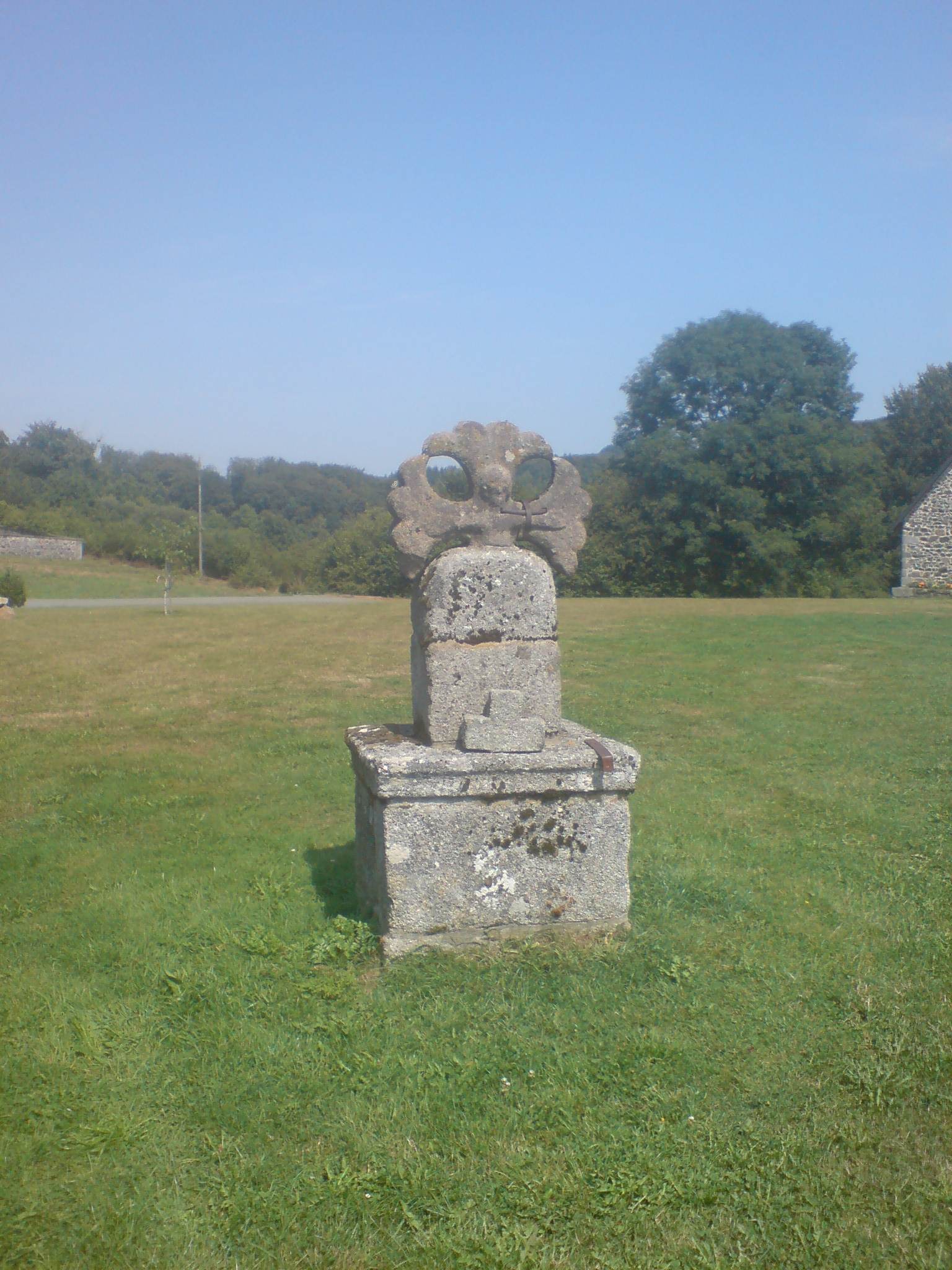
- 16th-century cross
- Location of Courteix
- Location within France Location within Nouvelle-Aquitaine
- Coordinates: 45°38′57″N 2°20′33″E
- Country: France
- Region: Nouvelle-Aquitaine
- Department: Corrèze
- Arrondissement: Ussel
- Canton: Ussel
- Intercommunality: Haute-Corrèze Communauté

Government
  - Mayor (2020–2026): Marie-Claude Lepage
- Area^{1}: 10.09 km^{2} (3.90 sq mi)
- Highest elevation: 846 m (2,776 ft)
- Lowest elevation: 700 m (2,300 ft)
- Population (2023): 63
  - Density: 6.2/km^{2} (16/sq mi)
- Time zone: UTC+01:00 (CET)
  - Summer (DST): UTC+02:00 (CEST)
- INSEE/Postal code: 19065 /19340
- ^{1} French Land Register data, which excludes lakes, ponds, glaciers > 1 km^{2} (0.386 sq mi or 247 acres) and river estuaries.

Courteix is a commune in the Corrèze department in central France.

== Population ==
Historical population
Year	Pop.	±% p.a.
1968	79	—
1975	74	−0.93%
1982	68	−1.20%
1990	59	−1.76%
1999	55	−0.78%
2007	65	+2.11%
2012	62	−0.94%
2017	66	+1.26%
2023	63	−0.77%
Source: INSEE

== See also ==
- Communes of the Corrèze department
