= Saint-Étienne-aux-Clos =

- Commune
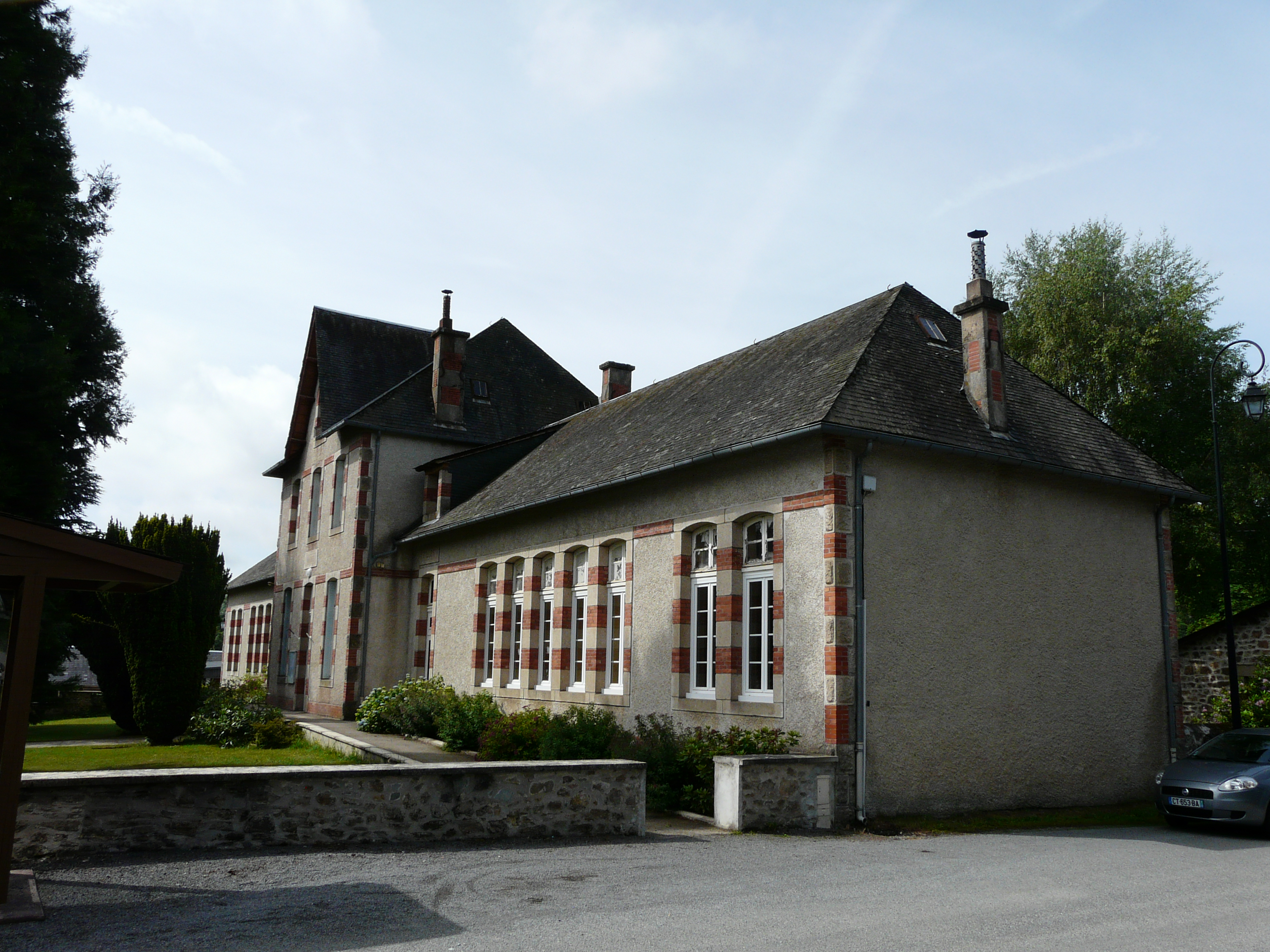
- The town hall and school in Saint-Étienne-aux-Clos

- Coat of arms
- Location of Saint-Étienne-aux-Clos
- Location within France Location within Nouvelle-Aquitaine
- Coordinates: 45°34′10″N 2°27′40″E
- Country: France
- Region: Nouvelle-Aquitaine
- Department: Corrèze
- Arrondissement: Ussel
- Canton: Haute-Dordogne
- Intercommunality: Haute-Corrèze Communauté

Government
  - Mayor (2021–2026): Isabelle Briquet
- Area^{1}: 34.78 km^{2} (13.43 sq mi)
- Elevation: 750 m (2,460 ft)
- Highest elevation: 793 m (2,602 ft)
- Lowest elevation: 555 m (1,821 ft)
- Population (2023): 246
  - Density: 7.07/km^{2} (18.3/sq mi)
- Time zone: UTC+01:00 (CET)
  - Summer (DST): UTC+02:00 (CEST)
- INSEE/Postal code: 19199 /19200
- ^{1} French Land Register data, which excludes lakes, ponds, glaciers > 1 km^{2} (0.386 sq mi or 247 acres) and river estuaries.

Saint-Étienne-aux-Clos (French pronunciation: [sɛ̃.t‿etjɛn o klo]; Auvergnat: Sent Estefe deus Chaus) is a commune in the Corrèze department in central France.

== Geography ==
The Chavanon forms most of the commune's eastern boundary.

== Population ==
Historical population
Year	Pop.	±% p.a.
1968	278	—
1975	228	−2.79%
1982	203	−1.65%
1990	198	−0.31%
1999	211	+0.71%
2007	235	+1.36%
2012	223	−1.04%
2017	229	+0.53%
2023	246	+1.20%
Source: INSEE

== See also ==
- Communes of the Corrèze department
