= Landogne =

- Commune
- Coat of arms
- Location of Landogne
- Location within France Location within Auvergne-Rhône-Alpes
- Coordinates: 45°52′42″N 2°39′26″E
- Country: France
- Region: Auvergne-Rhône-Alpes
- Department: Puy-de-Dôme
- Arrondissement: Riom
- Canton: Saint-Ours
- Intercommunality: CC Chavanon Combrailles et Volcans

Government
  - Mayor (2020–2026): Claude Collange
- Area^{1}: 17.37 km^{2} (6.71 sq mi)
- Elevation: 630 m (2,070 ft)
- Highest elevation: 715 m (2,346 ft)
- Lowest elevation: 540 m (1,770 ft)
- Population (2023): 228
  - Density: 13.1/km^{2} (34.0/sq mi)
- Time zone: UTC+01:00 (CET)
  - Summer (DST): UTC+02:00 (CEST)
- INSEE/Postal code: 63186 /63380
- ^{1} French Land Register data, which excludes lakes, ponds, glaciers > 1 km^{2} (0.386 sq mi or 247 acres) and river estuaries.

Landogne (French pronunciation: [lɑ̃dɔɲ]; Occitan: Landonha) is a commune in the Puy-de-Dôme department in Auvergne in central France.

== See also ==
- Communes of the Puy-de-Dôme department
