= Saint-Sulpice, Puy-de-Dôme =

Saint-Sulpice
- Commune
- Location of Saint-Sulpice
- Location within France Location within Auvergne-Rhône-Alpes
- Coordinates: 45°38′38″N 2°37′41″E
- Country: France
- Region: Auvergne-Rhône-Alpes
- Department: Puy-de-Dôme
- Arrondissement: Riom
- Canton: Saint-Ours

Government
  - Mayor (2026–32): Dominique Ondet
- Area^{1}: 18.22 km^{2} (7.03 sq mi)
- Elevation: 850 m (2,790 ft)
- Highest elevation: 922 m (3,025 ft)
- Lowest elevation: 691 m (2,267 ft)
- Population (2023): 85
  - Density: 4.7/km^{2} (12/sq mi)
- Time zone: UTC+01:00 (CET)
  - Summer (DST): UTC+02:00 (CEST)
- INSEE/Postal code: 63399 /63760
- ^{1} French Land Register data, which excludes lakes, ponds, glaciers > 1 km^{2} (0.386 sq mi or 247 acres) and river estuaries.

Saint-Sulpice (French pronunciation: [sɛ̃ sylpis]; Auvergnat: Sant Sulpici) is a commune in the Puy-de-Dôme department in Auvergne in central France.

Since 2026, six Vestas V110 wind turbines with a total installed capacity of 12.8 MW are producing 24 GWh electricity per year.

== See also ==
- Communes of the Puy-de-Dôme department
