= Canton of Ussel =

Coordinates: 45.55°N 2.31°E

The canton of Ussel is an administrative division of the Corrèze department, south-central France. It was created at the French canton reorganisation which came into effect in March 2015. Its seat is in Ussel.

It consists of the following communes:

1. Aix
2. Couffy-sur-Sarsonne
3. Courteix
4. Eygurande
5. Feyt
6. Lamazière-Haute
7. Laroche-près-Feyt
8. Merlines
9. Monestier-Merlines
10. Saint-Pardoux-le-Neuf
11. Ussel
