= Condat-en-Combraille =

- Commune
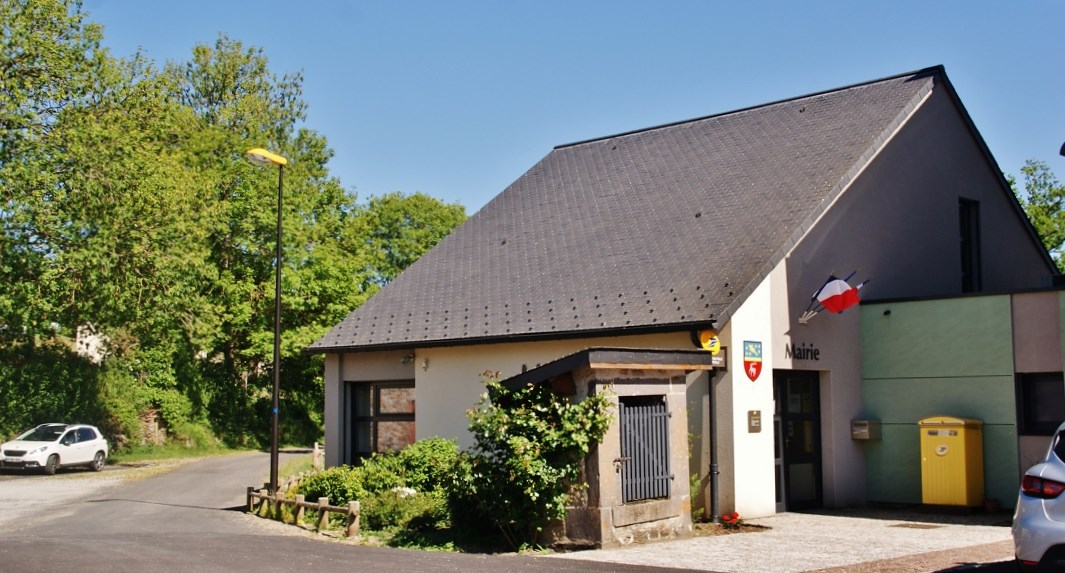
- The town hall in Condat-en-Combraille

- Coat of arms
- Location of Condat-en-Combraille
- Location within France Location within Auvergne-Rhône-Alpes
- Coordinates: 45°51′11″N 2°33′52″E
- Country: France
- Region: Auvergne-Rhône-Alpes
- Department: Puy-de-Dôme
- Arrondissement: Riom
- Canton: Saint-Ours
- Intercommunality: CC Chavanon Combrailles et Volcans

Government
  - Mayor (2026–32): Pascal Mouton
- Area^{1}: 45.74 km^{2} (17.66 sq mi)
- Elevation: 740 m (2,430 ft)
- Highest elevation: 772 m (2,533 ft)
- Lowest elevation: 620 m (2,030 ft)
- Population (2023): 413
  - Density: 9.03/km^{2} (23.4/sq mi)
- Time zone: UTC+01:00 (CET)
  - Summer (DST): UTC+02:00 (CEST)
- INSEE/Postal code: 63118 /63380
- ^{1} French Land Register data, which excludes lakes, ponds, glaciers > 1 km^{2} (0.386 sq mi or 247 acres) and river estuaries.

Condat-en-Combraille (French pronunciation: [kɔ̃da ɑ̃ kɔ̃bʁaj]; Occitan: Condat de Combralha) is a commune in the Puy-de-Dôme department in Auvergne-Rhône-Alpes in central France.

== See also ==
- Communes of the Puy-de-Dôme department
