= Saint-Pierre-le-Chastel =

- Commune
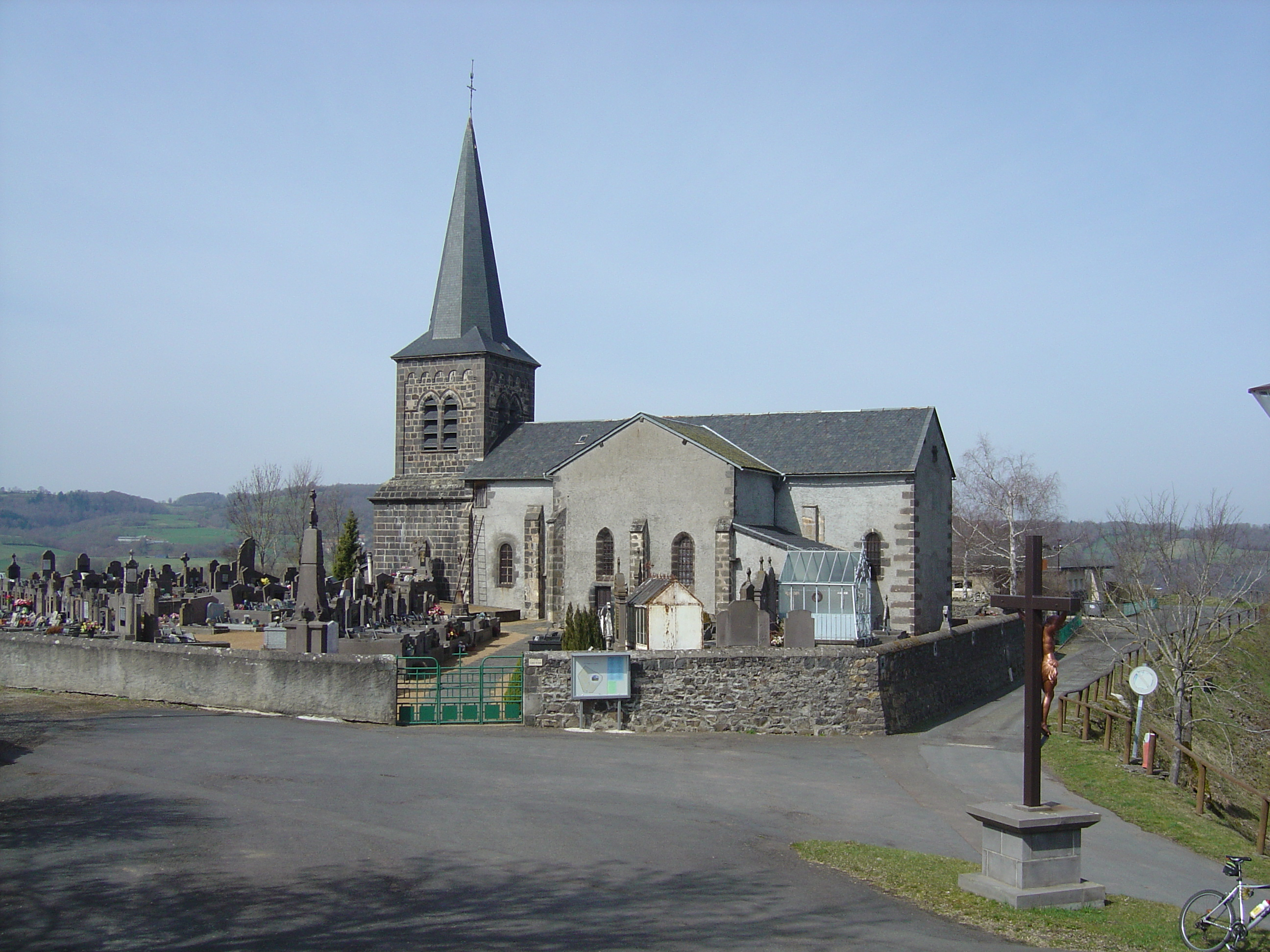
- The church in Saint-Pierre-le-Chastel

- Coat of arms
- Location of Saint-Pierre-le-Chastel
- Location within France Location within Auvergne-Rhône-Alpes
- Coordinates: 45°47′57″N 2°50′38″E
- Country: France
- Region: Auvergne-Rhône-Alpes
- Department: Puy-de-Dôme
- Arrondissement: Riom
- Canton: Saint-Ours

Government
  - Mayor (2020–2026): Janette Vialette Giraud
- Area^{1}: 17.45 km^{2} (6.74 sq mi)
- Highest elevation: 873 m (2,864 ft)
- Lowest elevation: 665 m (2,182 ft)
- Population (2023): 450
  - Density: 26/km^{2} (67/sq mi)
- Time zone: UTC+01:00 (CET)
  - Summer (DST): UTC+02:00 (CEST)
- INSEE/Postal code: 63385 /63230
- ^{1} French Land Register data, which excludes lakes, ponds, glaciers > 1 km^{2} (0.386 sq mi or 247 acres) and river estuaries.

Saint-Pierre-le-Chastel (French pronunciation: [sɛ̃ pjɛʁ lə ʃastɛl]; Auvergnat: Sant Pèire dau Chastèl) is a commune in the Puy-de-Dôme department in Auvergne in central France.

== See also ==
- Communes of the Puy-de-Dôme department
