= Feyt =

- Commune
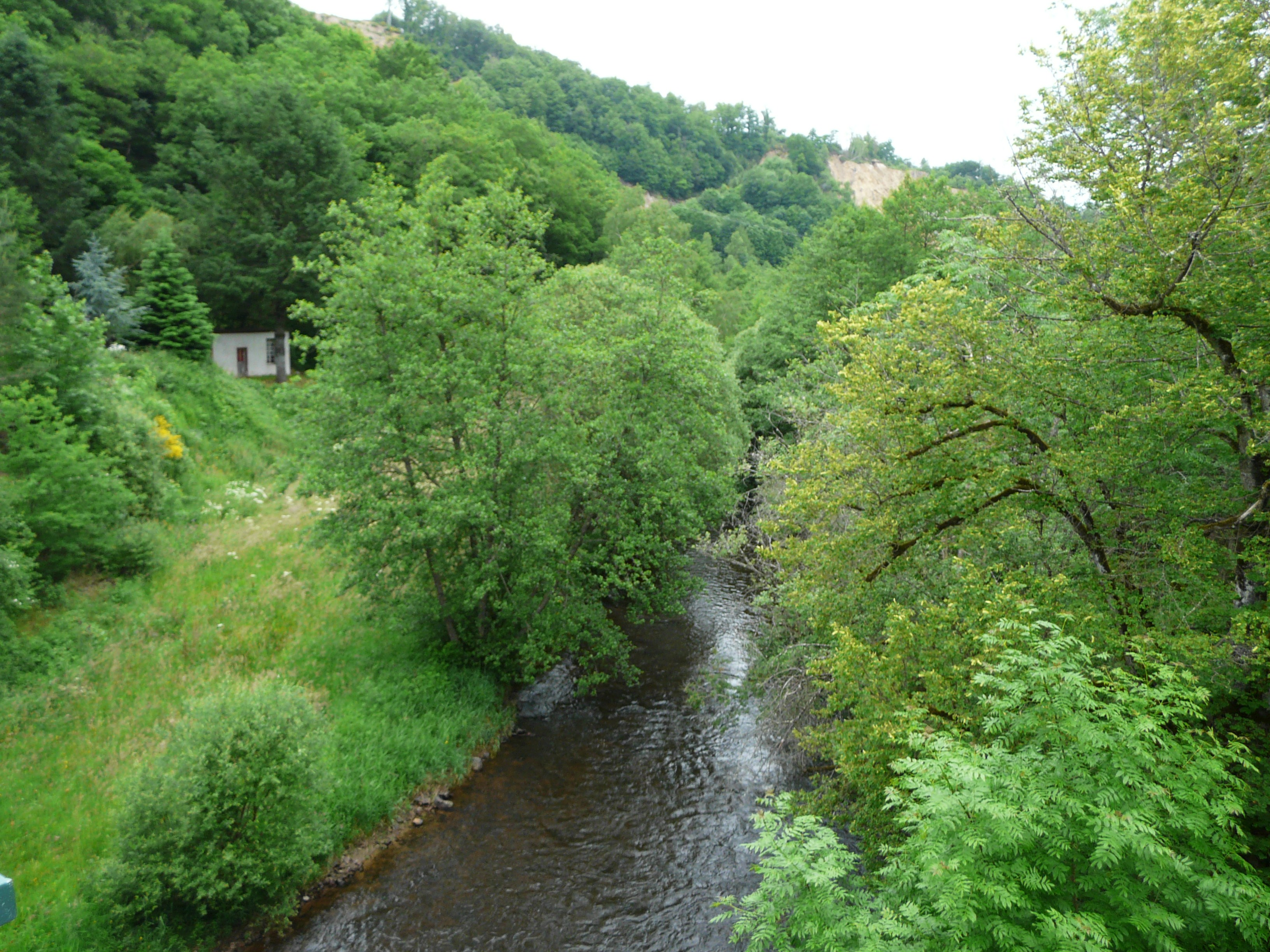
- The Chavanon river, in Feyt

- Coat of arms
- Location of Feyt
- Location within France Location within Nouvelle-Aquitaine
- Coordinates: 45°41′25″N 2°28′32″E
- Country: France
- Region: Nouvelle-Aquitaine
- Department: Corrèze
- Arrondissement: Ussel
- Canton: Ussel
- Intercommunality: Haute-Corrèze Communauté

Government
  - Mayor (2020–2026): Franck Rebuzzi
- Area^{1}: 19.56 km^{2} (7.55 sq mi)
- Elevation: 750 m (2,460 ft)
- Highest elevation: 804 m (2,638 ft)
- Lowest elevation: 637 m (2,090 ft)
- Population (2023): 110
  - Density: 5.6/km^{2} (15/sq mi)
- Time zone: UTC+01:00 (CET)
  - Summer (DST): UTC+02:00 (CEST)
- INSEE/Postal code: 19083 /19340
- ^{1} French Land Register data, which excludes lakes, ponds, glaciers > 1 km^{2} (0.386 sq mi or 247 acres) and river estuaries.

Feyt is a commune in the Corrèze department of central France.

== Geography ==
The Chavanon forms the commune's southeastern boundary.

== Population ==
Historical population
Year	Pop.	±% p.a.
1968	178	—
1975	145	−2.89%
1982	116	−3.14%
1990	119	+0.32%
1999	121	+0.19%
2007	100	−2.35%
2012	128	+5.06%
2017	132	+0.62%
2023	110	−2.99%
Source: INSEE

== See also ==
- Communes of the Corrèze department
