= Fernoël =

- Commune
- Coat of arms
- Location of Fernoël
- Location within France Location within Auvergne-Rhône-Alpes
- Coordinates: 45°48′41″N 2°26′05″E
- Country: France
- Region: Auvergne-Rhône-Alpes
- Department: Puy-de-Dôme
- Arrondissement: Riom
- Canton: Saint-Ours
- Intercommunality: CC Chavanon Combrailles et Volcans

Government
  - Mayor (2026–32): Pascal Gaulon
- Area^{1}: 14.43 km^{2} (5.57 sq mi)
- Elevation: 810 m (2,660 ft)
- Highest elevation: 809 m (2,654 ft)
- Lowest elevation: 735 m (2,411 ft)
- Population (2023): 137
  - Density: 9.49/km^{2} (24.6/sq mi)
- Time zone: UTC+01:00 (CET)
  - Summer (DST): UTC+02:00 (CEST)
- INSEE/Postal code: 63159 /63620
- ^{1} French Land Register data, which excludes lakes, ponds, glaciers > 1 km^{2} (0.386 sq mi or 247 acres) and river estuaries.

Fernoël (French pronunciation: [fɛʁnwɛl]) is a commune in the Puy-de-Dôme department in Auvergne in central France.

== Geography ==
The Chavanon (locally called la Ramade) forms most of the commune's western border.

== See also ==
- Communes of the Puy-de-Dôme department
