= Saint-Étienne-des-Champs =

- Commune
- Coat of arms
- Location of Saint-Étienne-des-Champs
- Location within France Location within Auvergne-Rhône-Alpes
- Coordinates: 45°49′48″N 2°34′34″E
- Country: France
- Region: Auvergne-Rhône-Alpes
- Department: Puy-de-Dôme
- Arrondissement: Riom
- Canton: Saint-Ours
- Area^{1}: 23.74 km^{2} (9.17 sq mi)
- Elevation: 750 m (2,460 ft)
- Highest elevation: 770 m (2,530 ft)
- Lowest elevation: 610 m (2,000 ft)
- Population (2023): 125
  - Density: 5.27/km^{2} (13.6/sq mi)
- Time zone: UTC+01:00 (CET)
  - Summer (DST): UTC+02:00 (CEST)
- INSEE/Postal code: 63339 /63380
- ^{1} French Land Register data, which excludes lakes, ponds, glaciers > 1 km^{2} (0.386 sq mi or 247 acres) and river estuaries.

Saint-Étienne-des-Champs (French pronunciation: [sɛ̃.t‿etjɛn de ʃɑ̃]; Auvergnat: Sant Estève dei Champs) is a commune in the Puy-de-Dôme department in Auvergne in central France.

== See also ==
- Communes of the Puy-de-Dôme department
