= Briffons =

- Commune
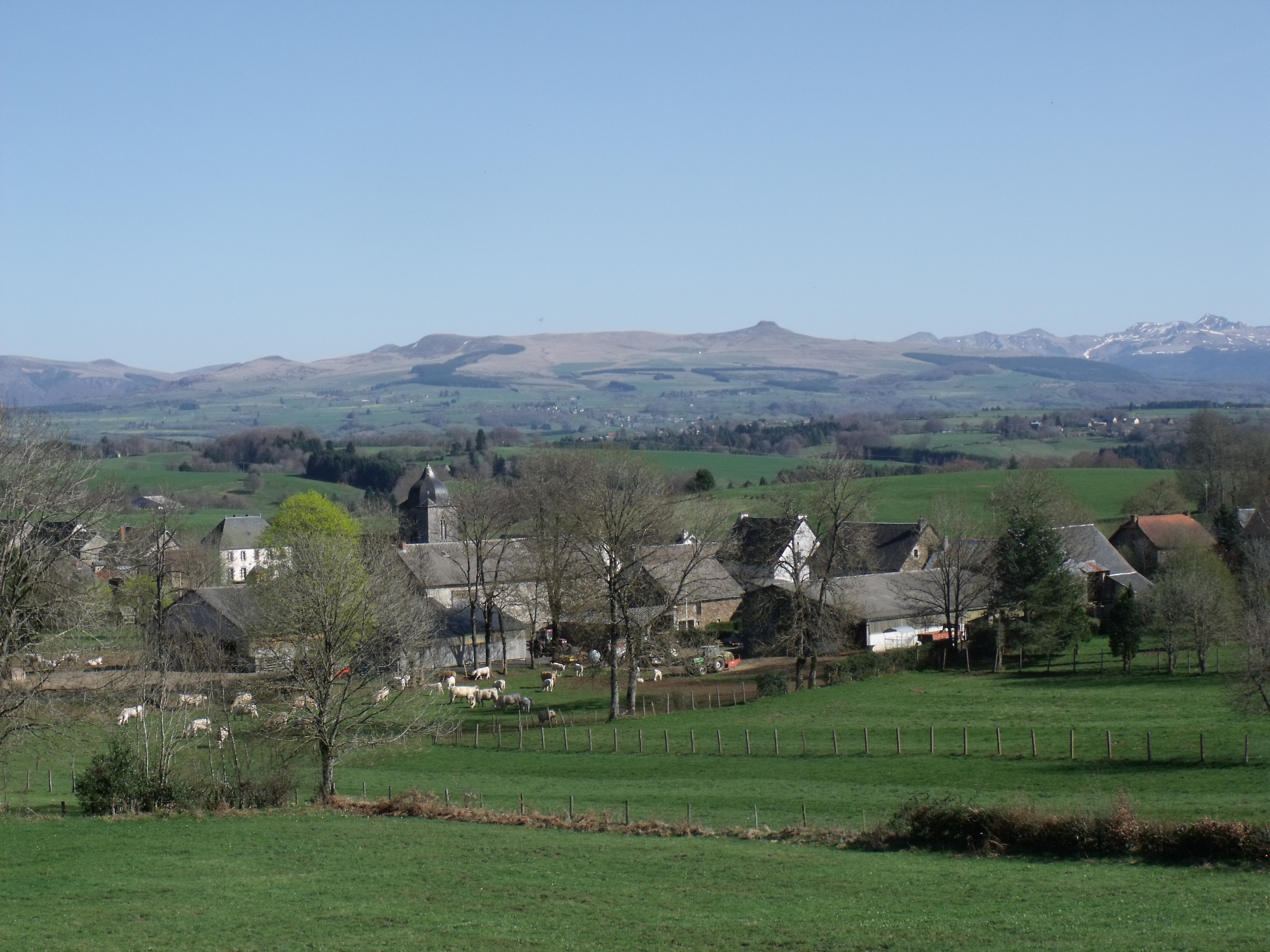
- A general view of Briffons

- Coat of arms
- Location of Briffons
- Location within France Location within Auvergne-Rhône-Alpes
- Coordinates: 45°41′59″N 2°39′26″E
- Country: France
- Region: Auvergne-Rhône-Alpes
- Department: Puy-de-Dôme
- Arrondissement: Riom
- Canton: Saint-Ours

Government
  - Mayor (2026–32): Pascale Souchal
- Area^{1}: 40.32 km^{2} (15.57 sq mi)
- Elevation: 900 m (3,000 ft)
- Highest elevation: 1,002 m (3,287 ft)
- Lowest elevation: 735 m (2,411 ft)
- Population (2023): 267
  - Density: 6.62/km^{2} (17.2/sq mi)
- Time zone: UTC+01:00 (CET)
  - Summer (DST): UTC+02:00 (CEST)
- INSEE/Postal code: 63053 /63820
- ^{1} French Land Register data, which excludes lakes, ponds, glaciers > 1 km^{2} (0.386 sq mi or 247 acres) and river estuaries.

Briffons (French pronunciation: [bʁifɔ̃]; Occitan: Brifònt) is a commune in the Puy-de-Dôme department in Auvergne-Rhône-Alpes in central France.

== Population ==
Historical population
Year	Pop.	±% p.a.
1968	582	—
1975	509	−1.90%
1982	415	−2.87%
1990	369	−1.46%
1999	335	−1.07%
2007	315	−0.77%
2012	295	−1.30%
2017	269	−1.83%
2023	267	−0.12%
Source: INSEE

== See also ==
- Communes of the Puy-de-Dôme department
