= Saint-Hilaire-les-Monges =

- Commune
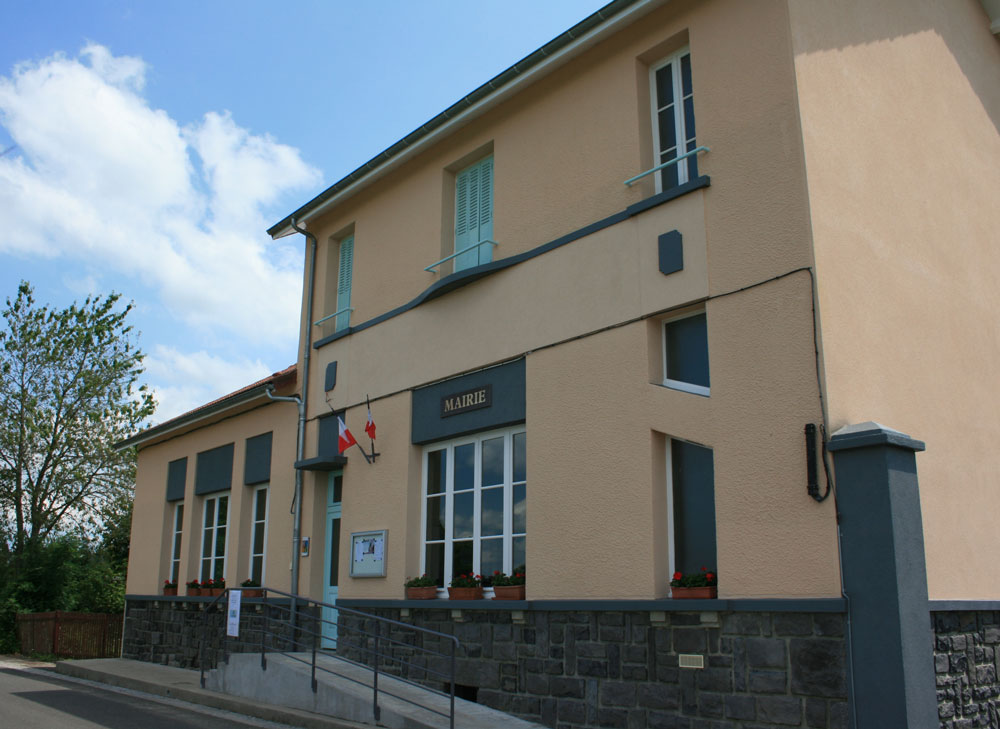
- The town hall in Saint-Hilaire-les-Monges
- Location of Saint-Hilaire-les-Monges
- Location within France Location within Auvergne-Rhône-Alpes
- Coordinates: 45°49′N 2°40′E
- Country: France
- Region: Auvergne-Rhône-Alpes
- Department: Puy-de-Dôme
- Arrondissement: Riom
- Canton: Saint-Ours

Government
  - Mayor (2020–2026): Georges Amadon
- Area^{1}: 10.7 km^{2} (4.1 sq mi)
- Elevation: 750 m (2,460 ft)
- Highest elevation: 856 m (2,808 ft)
- Lowest elevation: 620 m (2,030 ft)
- Population (2023): 83
  - Density: 7.8/km^{2} (20/sq mi)
- Time zone: UTC+01:00 (CET)
  - Summer (DST): UTC+02:00 (CEST)
- INSEE/Postal code: 63359 /63380
- ^{1} French Land Register data, which excludes lakes, ponds, glaciers > 1 km^{2} (0.386 sq mi or 247 acres) and river estuaries.

Saint-Hilaire-les-Monges (French pronunciation: [sɛ̃.t‿ilɛʁ le mɔ̃ʒ]; Occitan: Sent Alari de los Monges) is a commune in the Puy-de-Dôme department in Auvergne in central France.

== See also ==
- Communes of the Puy-de-Dôme department
