= Saint-Avit, Puy-de-Dôme =

Saint-Avit
- Commune
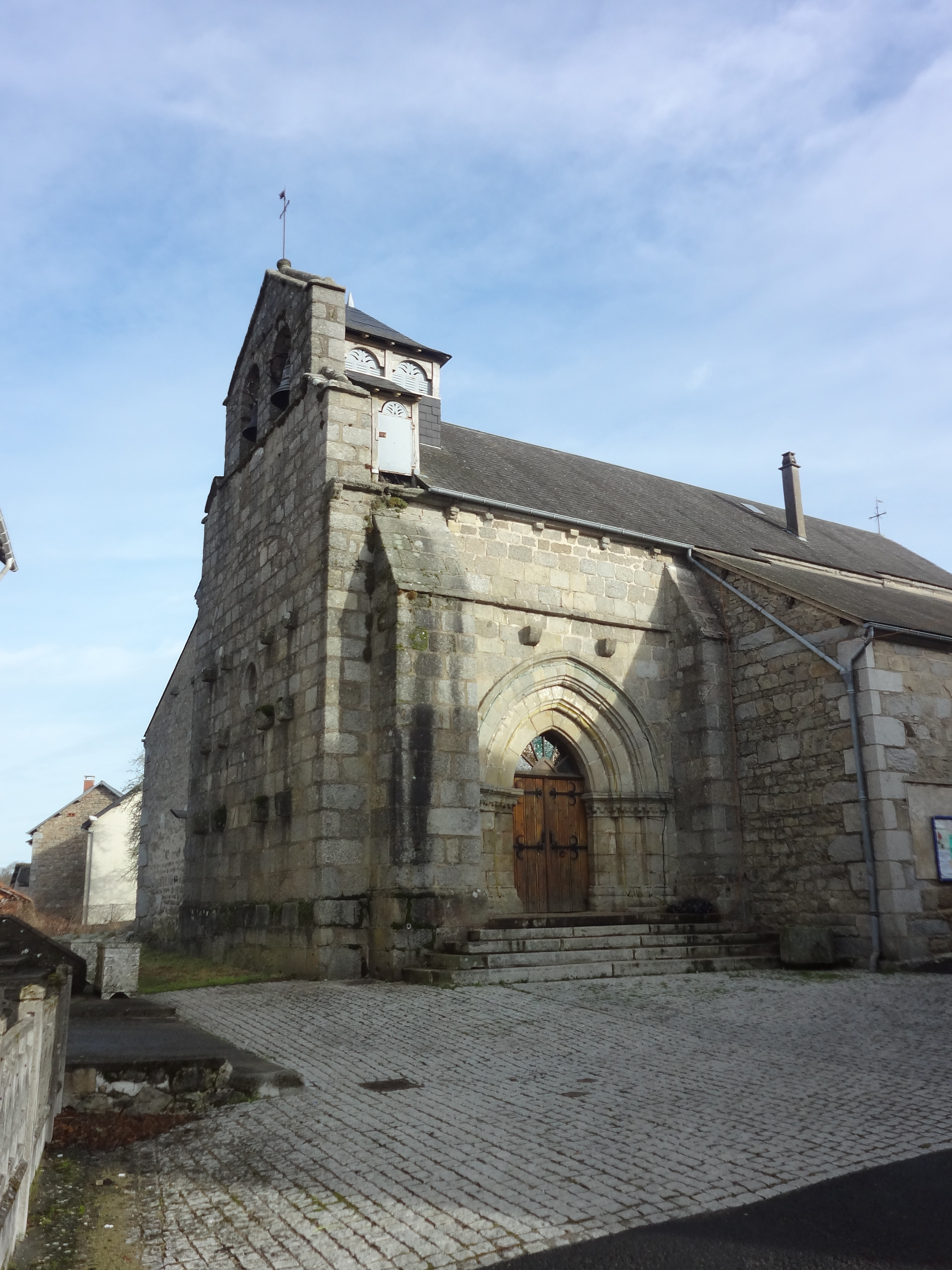
- The church in Saint-Avit

- Coat of arms
- Location of Saint-Avit
- Location within France Location within Auvergne-Rhône-Alpes
- Coordinates: 45°52′23″N 2°31′29″E
- Country: France
- Region: Auvergne-Rhône-Alpes
- Department: Puy-de-Dôme
- Arrondissement: Riom
- Canton: Saint-Ours
- Intercommunality: CC Chavanon Combrailles et Volcans

Government
  - Mayor (2020–2026): Nicolas Montpeyroux
- Area^{1}: 19.47 km^{2} (7.52 sq mi)
- Elevation: 716 m (2,349 ft)
- Highest elevation: 752 m (2,467 ft)
- Lowest elevation: 655 m (2,149 ft)
- Population (2023): 208
  - Density: 10.7/km^{2} (27.7/sq mi)
- Time zone: UTC+01:00 (CET)
  - Summer (DST): UTC+02:00 (CEST)
- INSEE/Postal code: 63320 /63380
- ^{1} French Land Register data, which excludes lakes, ponds, glaciers > 1 km^{2} (0.386 sq mi or 247 acres) and river estuaries.

Saint-Avit is a commune in the Puy-de-Dôme department in Auvergne in central France.

== See also ==
- Communes of the Puy-de-Dôme department
