= Couffy-sur-Sarsonne =

- Commune
- Coat of arms
- Location of Couffy-sur-Sarsonne
- Location within France Location within Nouvelle-Aquitaine
- Coordinates: 45°39′44″N 2°19′46″E
- Country: France
- Region: Nouvelle-Aquitaine
- Department: Corrèze
- Arrondissement: Ussel
- Canton: Ussel
- Intercommunality: Haute-Corrèze Communauté

Government
  - Mayor (2020–2026): Christiane Monteil
- Area^{1}: 14.05 km^{2} (5.42 sq mi)
- Highest elevation: 915 m (3,002 ft)
- Lowest elevation: 727 m (2,385 ft)
- Population (2023): 72
  - Density: 5.1/km^{2} (13/sq mi)
- Time zone: UTC+01:00 (CET)
  - Summer (DST): UTC+02:00 (CEST)
- INSEE/Postal code: 19064 /19340
- ^{1} French Land Register data, which excludes lakes, ponds, glaciers > 1 km^{2} (0.386 sq mi or 247 acres) and river estuaries.

Couffy-sur-Sarsonne (French pronunciation: [kufi syʁ saʁsɔn]; Occitan: Confin de Sarsòna) is a commune in the Corrèze department in central France.

== Population ==
Historical population
Year	Pop.	±% p.a.
1968	119	—
1975	104	−1.91%
1982	95	−1.28%
1990	89	−0.81%
1999	70	−2.63%
2007	74	+0.70%
2012	75	+0.27%
2017	76	+0.27%
2023	72	−0.90%
Source: INSEE

== See also ==
- Communes of the Corrèze department
