= Flayat =

Commune in Nouvelle-Aquitaine, France

- Commune
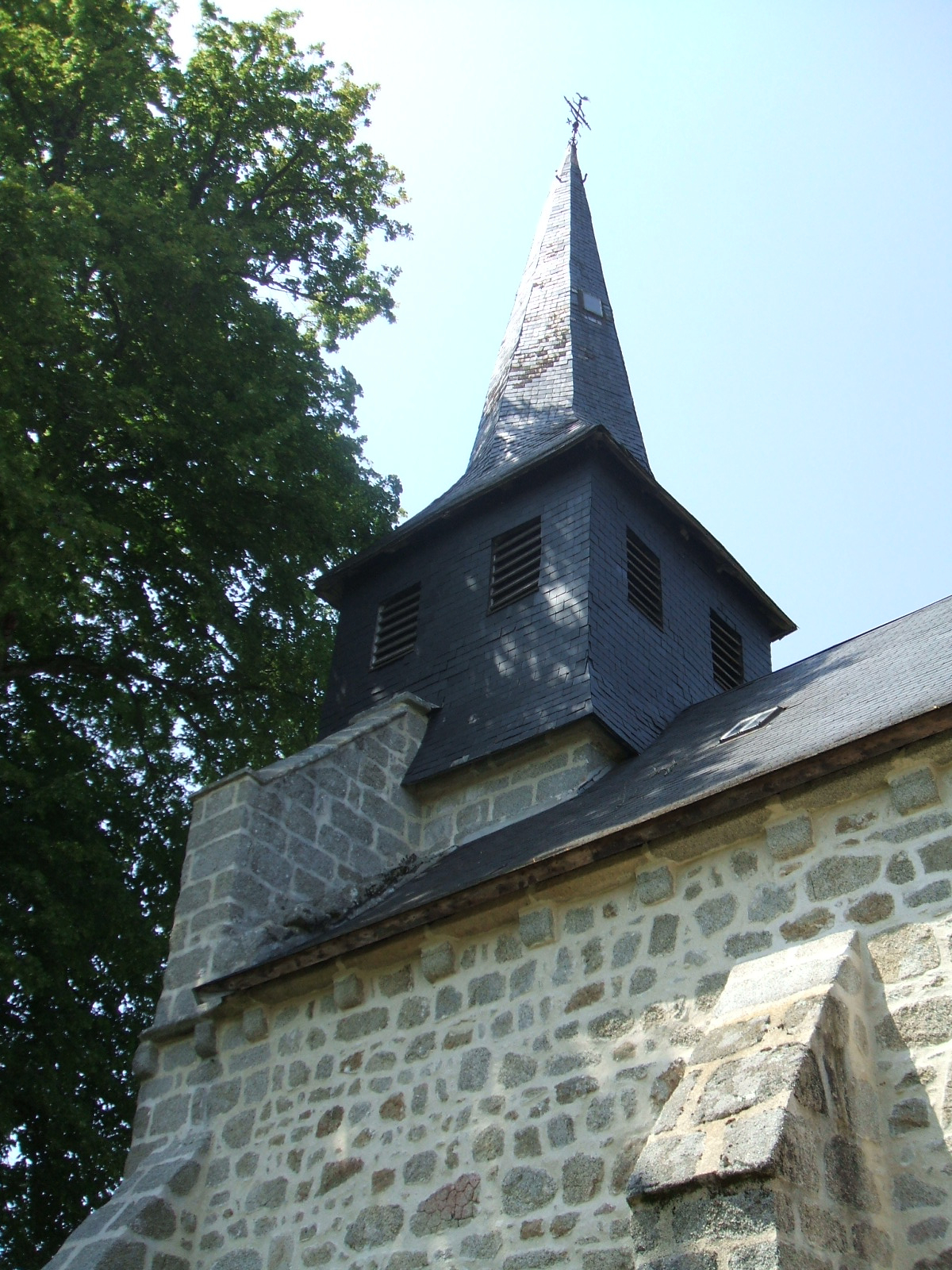
- The parish church of Saint-Martin, in Flayat
- Location of Flayat
- Location within France Location within Nouvelle-Aquitaine
- Coordinates: 45°46′39″N 2°22′59″E
- Country: France
- Region: Nouvelle-Aquitaine
- Department: Creuse
- Arrondissement: Aubusson
- Canton: Auzances
- Intercommunality: CC Marche et Combraille en Aquitaine

Government
  - Mayor (2021–2026): Patrick Mounaud
- Area^{1}: 43.53 km^{2} (16.81 sq mi)
- Highest elevation: 827 m (2,713 ft)
- Lowest elevation: 735 m (2,411 ft)
- Population (2023): 296
  - Density: 6.80/km^{2} (17.6/sq mi)
- Time zone: UTC+01:00 (CET)
  - Summer (DST): UTC+02:00 (CEST)
- INSEE/Postal code: 23081 /23260
- ^{1} French Land Register data, which excludes lakes, ponds, glaciers > 1 km^{2} (0.386 sq mi or 247 acres) and river estuaries.

Flayat (French pronunciation: [flaja]; Occitan: Flaiac) is a commune in the Creuse department in the Nouvelle-Aquitaine region in central France.

== Geography ==
An area of lakes and streams, forestry and farming, comprising the village and several hamlets situated in the upper valley of the river Méouzette some 17 miles (27 km) southeast of Aubusson, at the junction of the D21, D30 and the D996 roads. The commune has an eastern border with the department of Allier and is within the national park of the Millevaches (not 1000 cows, but lakes).

The Chavanon (locally called la Ramade) forms most of the commune's eastern border.

== Population ==
Historical population
Year	Pop.	±% p.a.
1968	533	—
1975	489	−1.22%
1982	447	−1.27%
1990	364	−2.53%
1999	380	+0.48%
2007	347	−1.13%
2012	330	−1.00%
2017	309	−1.31%
2023	296	−0.71%
Source: INSEE

== Sights ==
- The sixteenth-century church of St. Martin.
- The chapel of Salesses, dating from the thirteenth century.
- The chapel of St. Clair, from the eighteenth century.
- A chateau.

== See also ==
- Communes of the Creuse department
