= Saint-Ours, Puy-de-Dôme =

Saint-Ours
- Commune
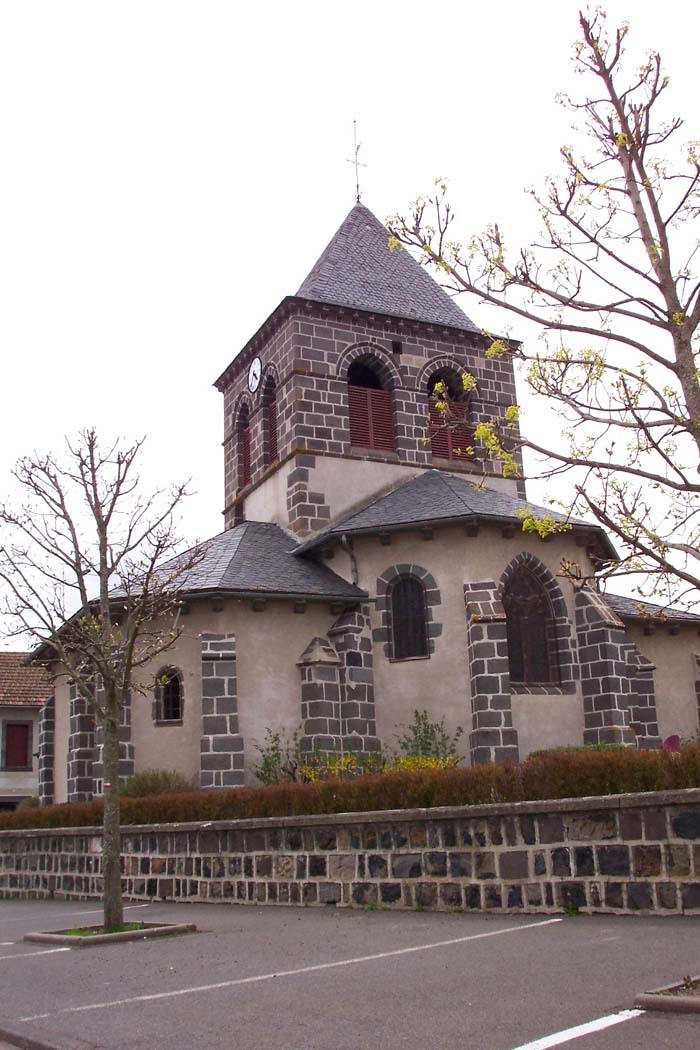
- The church in Saint-Ours

- Coat of arms
- Location of Saint-Ours
- Location within France Location within Auvergne-Rhône-Alpes
- Coordinates: 45°51′03″N 2°53′33″E
- Country: France
- Region: Auvergne-Rhône-Alpes
- Department: Puy-de-Dôme
- Arrondissement: Riom
- Canton: Saint-Ours
- Intercommunality: CA Riom Limagne et Volcans

Government
  - Mayor (2026–32): Stéphane Poncé
- Area^{1}: 55.64 km^{2} (21.48 sq mi)
- Highest elevation: 1,202 m (3,944 ft)
- Lowest elevation: 596 m (1,955 ft)
- Population (2023): 1,708
  - Density: 30.70/km^{2} (79.51/sq mi)
- Demonym: Ursiniens
- Time zone: UTC+01:00 (CET)
  - Summer (DST): UTC+02:00 (CEST)
- INSEE/Postal code: 63381 /63230
- ^{1} French Land Register data, which excludes lakes, ponds, glaciers > 1 km^{2} (0.386 sq mi or 247 acres) and river estuaries.

Saint-Ours (French pronunciation: [sɛ̃.t‿uʁs]; Auvergnat: Sent Ors) is a commune in the Puy-de-Dôme department in Auvergne in central France.

== See also ==
- Vulcania
- Communes of the Puy-de-Dôme department
