= Miremont, Puy-de-Dôme =

Miremont
- Commune
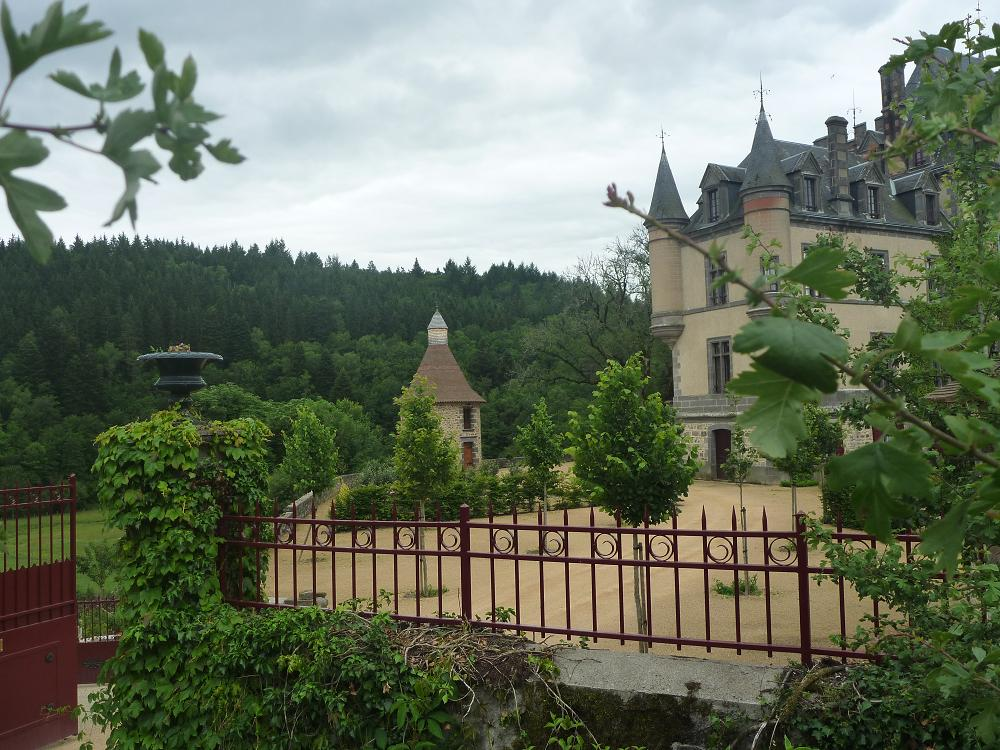
- The chateau in Miremont

- Coat of arms
- Location of Miremont
- Location within France Location within Auvergne-Rhône-Alpes
- Coordinates: 45°53′57″N 2°43′04″E
- Country: France
- Region: Auvergne-Rhône-Alpes
- Department: Puy-de-Dôme
- Arrondissement: Riom
- Canton: Saint-Ours
- Intercommunality: CC Chavanon Combrailles et Volcans

Government
  - Mayor (2020–2026): Jacques-Philippe Saint-Gerand
- Area^{1}: 36.79 km^{2} (14.20 sq mi)
- Elevation: 506 m (1,660 ft)
- Highest elevation: 727 m (2,385 ft)
- Lowest elevation: 500 m (1,600 ft)
- Population (2023): 300
  - Density: 8.2/km^{2} (21/sq mi)
- Time zone: UTC+01:00 (CET)
  - Summer (DST): UTC+02:00 (CEST)
- INSEE/Postal code: 63228 /63380
- ^{1} French Land Register data, which excludes lakes, ponds, glaciers > 1 km^{2} (0.386 sq mi or 247 acres) and river estuaries.

Miremont is a French commune, located in the department of Puy-de-Dôme in the Auvergne-Rhône-Alpes region.

== See also ==
- Communes of the Puy-de-Dôme department
