= Vulcania =

French theme park

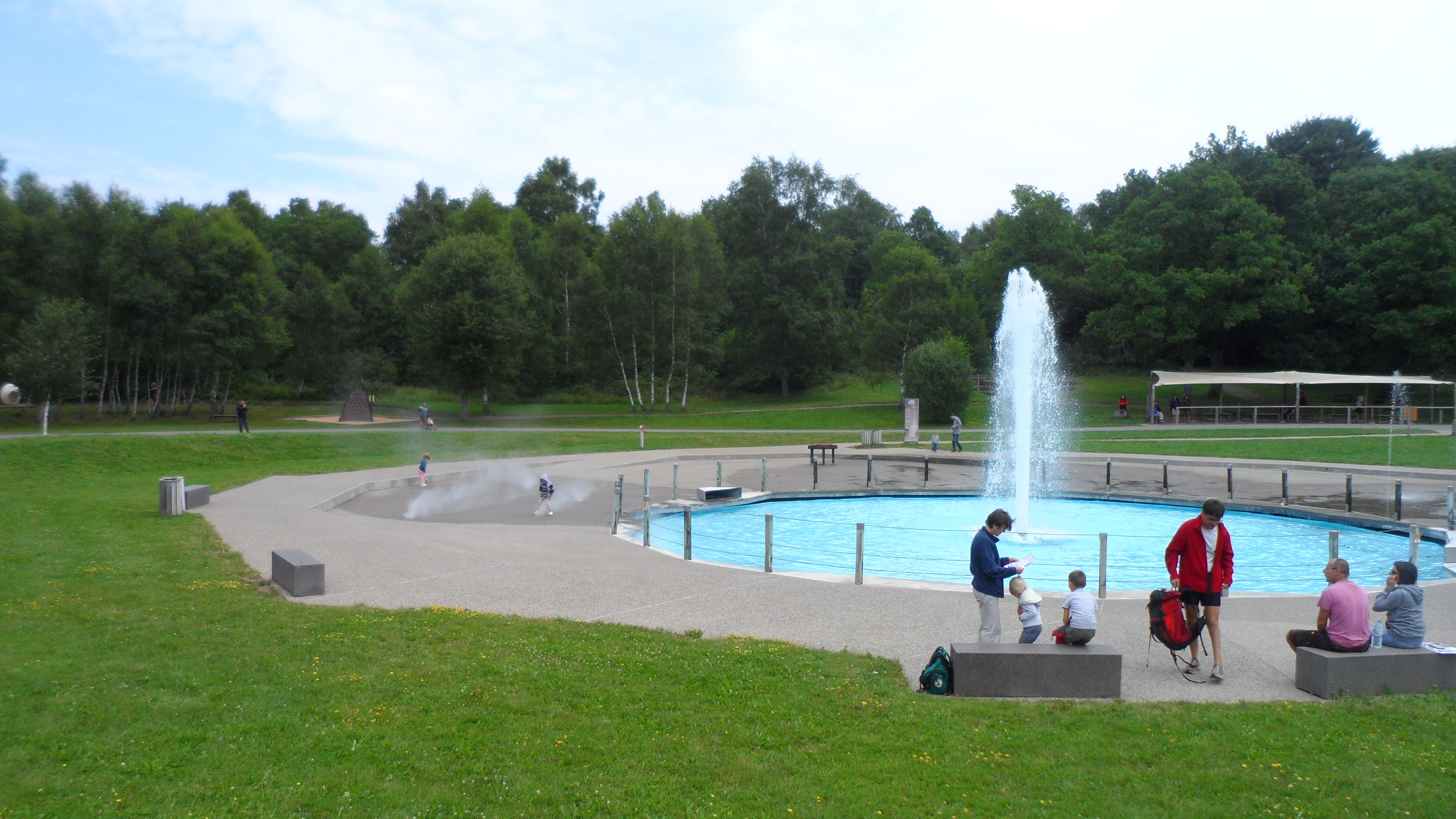
- Outdoor area
- Interactive map of Vulcania
- Location: Route de Mazayes, Saint-Ours-Les-Roches, France
- Coordinates: 45.813449°N 2.940501°E
- Owner: Regional Council of Auvergne
- Theme: Volcano
- Slogan: The Adventure of the Earth
- Operating season: All year round
- Attendance: Approx. 350,000
- Website: www.vulcania.com

Vulcania, the "European Park of Volcanism", is an educational French amusement park and museum with a volcano theme. Situated in Saint-Ours-les-Roches, Auvergne, 15 km north-west of Clermont-Ferrand, it was officially inaugurated in 2002.

== History ==
The project was the brainchild of French volcanologists Katia and Maurice Krafft, who died at Mount Unzen in 1991. The Krafft couple and their work had a great impact on the former President of France, Valéry Giscard d'Estaing, who pushed for the construction of the park while he was President of the Regional Council of Auvergne.

== Criticism ==
The project has faced criticism from its very inception. The strong involvement of the former president added a political dimension to the economic, technical and environmental issues . From an environmental perspective, the construction of Vulcania in the heart of the Chaîne des Puys met strong opposition from conservationists. Contrary to this argument, the land had hydrocarbon deposits as the site was formerly owned by the military, therefore the project rehabilitated the land.

Another strong criticism emerged due to the financial losses faced from the over-estimated number of visitors. In 2004, the park was operating with a deficit of €1.707 million.

== Design ==
The architect behind the design of the park was Pritzker Prize-winning, Austrian Hans Hollein. Three-quarters of the foundations are sunk underground, which aided in the rehabilitation of the land. Visitors approach a 'metaphorical Volcano' by descending down a ramp towards a cone-shaped structure clad in dark stone and lined on the inside with a gold metal.

The design incorporates research and conference facilities, large IMAX theaters, greenhouses to highlight the positive effects of volcanism — fertility — and a restaurant with views out to the whole nature park. The site is secluded and is also utilised for recreation and hiking.

=== Attractions ===
One of the attractions at Vulcania is the 4-D film The Awakening of the Auvergne Giants. In 2008 Vulcania opened four new attractions, including the Volcanbul, a GPS-driven robot that gives tours of the area around Vulcania. To quote from the Vulcania Web site "VolcanBul Eco-friendly and innovating the VolcanBul is an electric vehicle guided by GPS." It was specifically implemented to improve the rate of revisits and encourage visitors to spend an entire day exploring the different areas, rather than half-day as is usually the case for museums.

== In literature and film ==
Vulcan is the mythical smithy of the Roman gods, described in Virgil's Aeneid 8:425. It is also the secret base of Captain Nemo in Walt Disney's film version of Jules Verne's 1870 novel Twenty Thousand Leagues Under the Seas, but it is not mentioned in the original novel.
