= La Celle, Puy-de-Dôme =

La Celle
- Commune
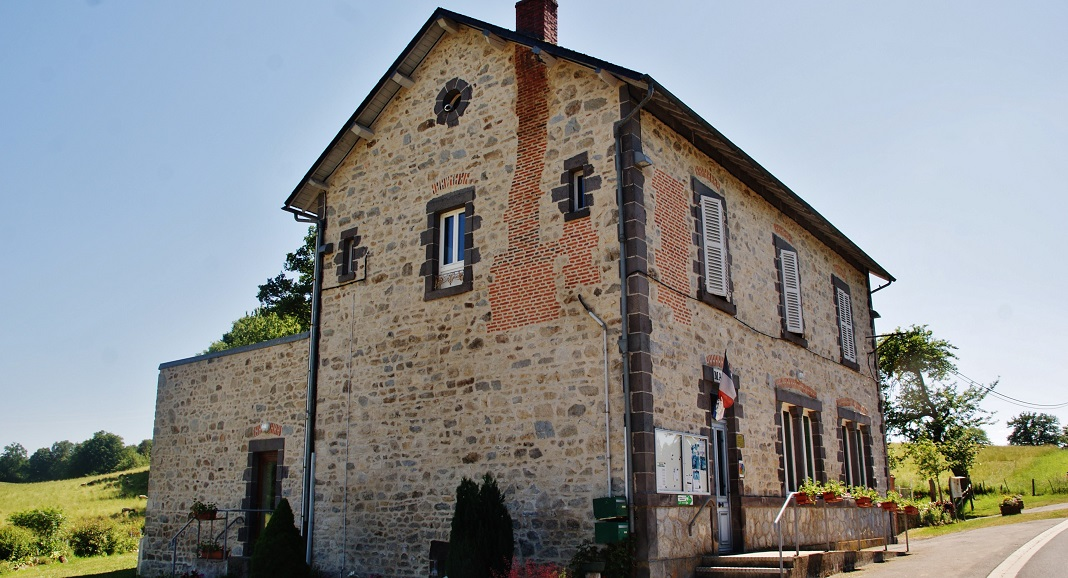
- The town hall in La Celle

- Coat of arms
- Location of La Celle
- Location within France Location within Auvergne-Rhône-Alpes
- Coordinates: 45°51′18″N 2°28′37″E
- Country: France
- Region: Auvergne-Rhône-Alpes
- Department: Puy-de-Dôme
- Arrondissement: Riom
- Canton: Saint-Ours

Government
  - Mayor (2026–32): Elisabeth Demeneix
- Area^{1}: 15.85 km^{2} (6.12 sq mi)
- Elevation: 650 m (2,130 ft)
- Highest elevation: 822 m (2,697 ft)
- Lowest elevation: 702 m (2,303 ft)
- Population (2023): 81
  - Density: 5.1/km^{2} (13/sq mi)
- Time zone: UTC+01:00 (CET)
  - Summer (DST): UTC+02:00 (CEST)
- INSEE/Postal code: 63064 /63620
- ^{1} French Land Register data, which excludes lakes, ponds, glaciers > 1 km^{2} (0.386 sq mi or 247 acres) and river estuaries.

La Celle (French pronunciation: [la sɛl]; Occitan: La Cela) is a commune in the Puy-de-Dôme department in Auvergne-Rhône-Alpes in central France.

== Population ==
Historical population
Year	Pop.	±% p.a.
1968	187	—
1975	152	−2.92%
1982	115	−3.91%
1990	100	−1.73%
1999	88	−1.41%
2007	85	−0.43%
2012	85	+0.00%
2017	84	−0.24%
2023	81	−0.60%
Source: INSEE

== See also ==
- Communes of the Puy-de-Dôme department
