= Sauvagnat =

- Commune
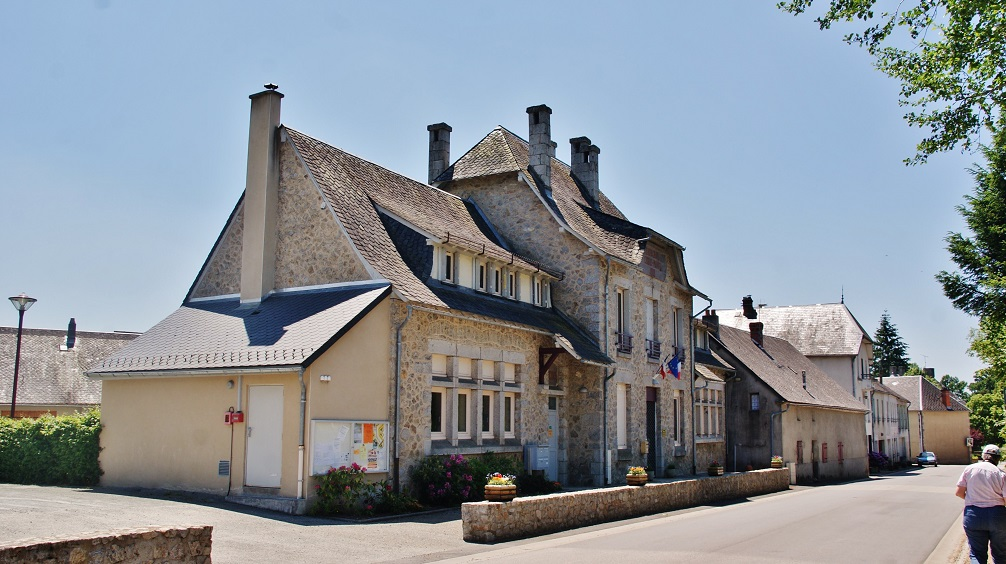
- The town hall in Sauvagnat
- Location of Sauvagnat
- Location within France Location within Auvergne-Rhône-Alpes
- Coordinates: 45°46′12″N 2°37′05″E
- Country: France
- Region: Auvergne-Rhône-Alpes
- Department: Puy-de-Dôme
- Arrondissement: Riom
- Canton: Saint-Ours
- Intercommunality: Chavanon Combrailles et Volcans

Government
  - Mayor (2026–32): Franck Milord
- Area^{1}: 24.13 km^{2} (9.32 sq mi)
- Elevation: 735 m (2,411 ft)
- Highest elevation: 873 m (2,864 ft)
- Lowest elevation: 654 m (2,146 ft)
- Population (2023): 143
  - Density: 5.93/km^{2} (15.3/sq mi)
- Time zone: UTC+01:00 (CET)
  - Summer (DST): UTC+02:00 (CEST)
- INSEE/Postal code: 63410 /63470
- ^{1} French Land Register data, which excludes lakes, ponds, glaciers > 1 km^{2} (0.386 sq mi or 247 acres) and river estuaries.

Sauvagnat (French pronunciation: [sovaɲa]) is a commune in the Puy-de-Dôme department in Auvergne-Rhône-Alpes in central France.

== See also ==
- Communes of the Puy-de-Dôme department
