= Merlines =

- Commune
- Chavanon viaduct

- Coat of arms
- Location of Merlines
- Location within France Location within Nouvelle-Aquitaine
- Coordinates: 45°38′53″N 2°27′40″E
- Country: France
- Region: Nouvelle-Aquitaine
- Department: Corrèze
- Arrondissement: Ussel
- Canton: Ussel
- Intercommunality: Haute-Corrèze Communauté

Government
  - Mayor (2026–2032): Jérôme Krolik
- Area^{1}: 14.07 km^{2} (5.43 sq mi)
- Highest elevation: 773 m (2,536 ft)
- Lowest elevation: 590 m (1,940 ft)
- Population (2023): 741
  - Density: 52.7/km^{2} (136/sq mi)
- Time zone: UTC+01:00 (CET)
  - Summer (DST): UTC+02:00 (CEST)
- INSEE/Postal code: 19134 /19340
- ^{1} French Land Register data, which excludes lakes, ponds, glaciers > 1 km^{2} (0.386 sq mi or 247 acres) and river estuaries.

Merlines (French pronunciation: [mɛʁlin]; Occitan: Merlinas) is a commune in the Corrèze department in central France.

== History ==
Under the Ancien Régime, the territory of Merlines depended on the lord of La Garde-Guillotin (Ussel family) and the prior of Port-Dieu.

== Geography ==
The Chavanon forms the commune's eastern boundary. The commune is situated on a rolling plateau at 720 m altitude, crossed to the south-south by the Chavanon river at the bottom of steep gorges (bottom at 590 m altitude). It borders the commune of Messeix, in Auvergne-Rhône-Alpes, and adjoins the commune of Eygurande Nord, 2 kilometres away.

Between the two communes, an artificial recreational lake (the Étang de l'Abeille) was created in the 1970s.

== Population ==
Historical population
Year	Pop.	±% p.a.
1968	1,027	—
1975	979	−0.68%
1982	1,028	+0.70%
1990	948	−1.01%
1999	903	−0.54%
2007	818	−1.23%
2012	779	−0.97%
2017	718	−1.62%
2023	741	+0.53%
Source: INSEE

== Places and monuments ==
- The L'Église Paroissiale Saint-Blaise and Sainte-Madeleine from the 15th-century. It is listed in the General Inventory of Cultural Heritage. The church dates from the 15th-century but was remodelled in 1883, with a porch tower replacing the bell tower. The ribs of vault collapsed in 1818 and was replaced plastered brick barrel vault. It has two small chapels and the stained windows date from 1887 and 1891.
- A monumental 16th-century cross.
- The Chavanon Viaduct (A89 motorway, viewpoint with panorama over the Chaîne des Puys).
- The Viaduc de la Barricade (A89 motorway).

But also :

- Former Chavanon hydroelectric dam.
- Étang de l'Abeille.
- Vallée de la Barricade.
- Vallée du Chavanon (natural site).
- Viewpoint from the train station platform over the Chaîne des Puys.
- Site of the Château de Lagarde (la Garde-Guillotin).
- Lime kilns of Gioux.

== See also ==
- Communes of the Corrèze department
