= Cisternes-la-Forêt =

- Commune
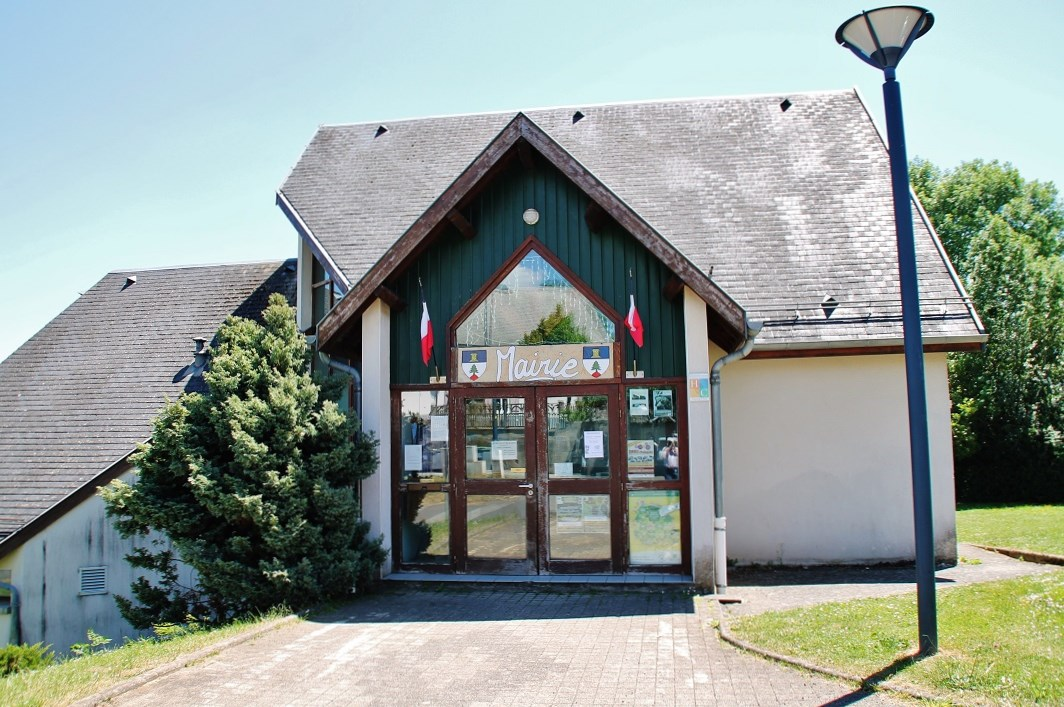
- The town hall in Cisternes-la-Forêt

- Coat of arms
- Location of Cisternes-la-Forêt
- Location within France Location within Auvergne-Rhône-Alpes
- Coordinates: 45°47′28″N 2°42′21″E
- Country: France
- Region: Auvergne-Rhône-Alpes
- Department: Puy-de-Dôme
- Arrondissement: Riom
- Canton: Saint-Ours
- Intercommunality: Chavanon Combrailles et Volcans

Government
  - Mayor (2026–32): Martine Barrier
- Area^{1}: 33.58 km^{2} (12.97 sq mi)
- Elevation: 800 m (2,600 ft)
- Highest elevation: 945 m (3,100 ft)
- Lowest elevation: 592 m (1,942 ft)
- Population (2023): 443
  - Density: 13.2/km^{2} (34.2/sq mi)
- Time zone: UTC+01:00 (CET)
  - Summer (DST): UTC+02:00 (CEST)
- INSEE/Postal code: 63110 /63740
- ^{1} French Land Register data, which excludes lakes, ponds, glaciers > 1 km^{2} (0.386 sq mi or 247 acres) and river estuaries.

Cisternes-la-Forêt (French pronunciation: [sistɛʁn la fɔʁɛ]) is a commune in the Puy-de-Dôme department in Auvergne-Rhône-Alpes in central France. The population as of 2019 was 463.

== See also ==
- Communes of the Puy-de-Dôme department
