= Saint-Julien-Puy-Lavèze =

- Commune
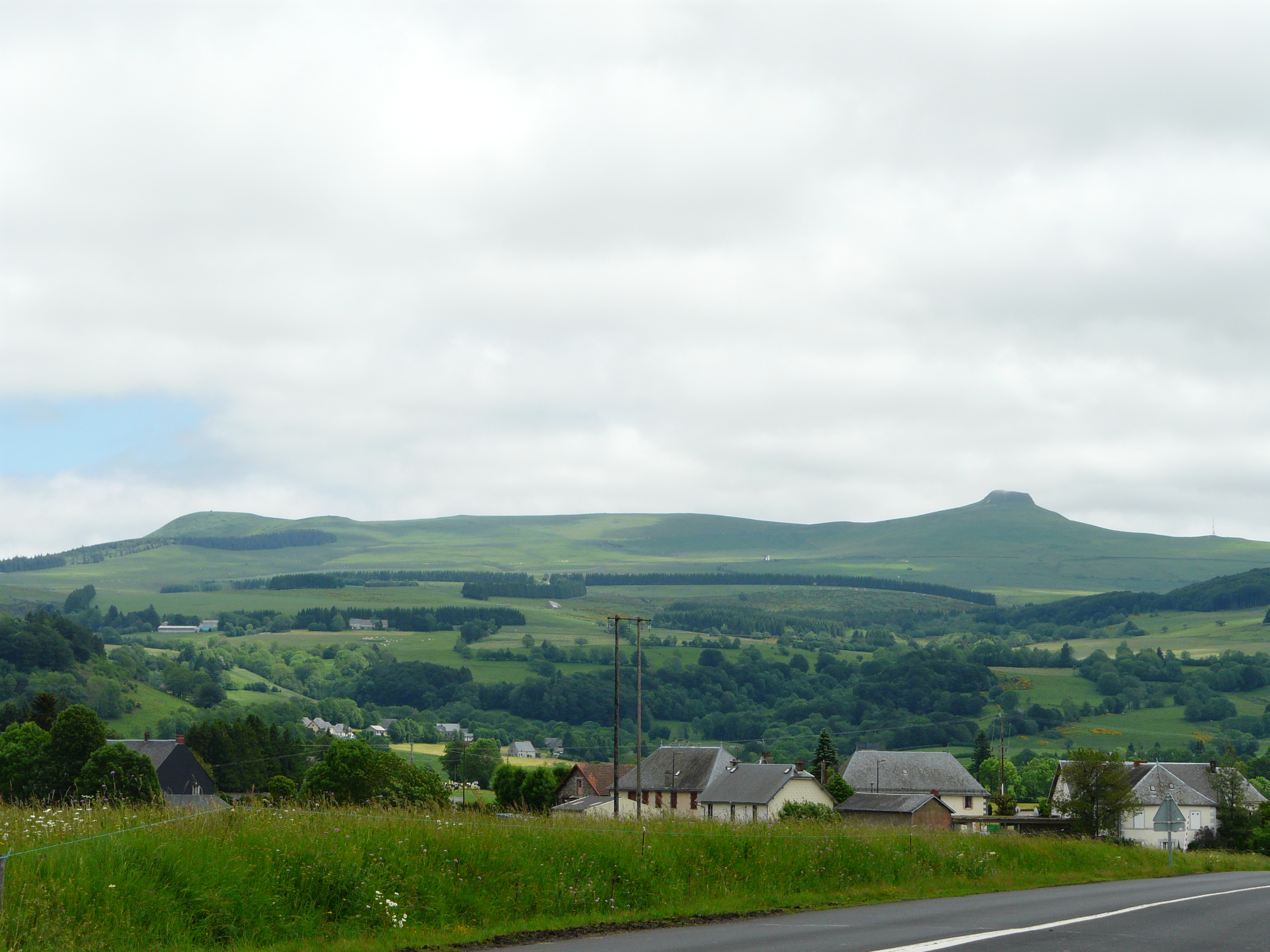
- A view from outside Laqueuille railway station in Saint-Julien-Puy-Lavèze

- Coat of arms
- Location of Saint-Julien-Puy-Lavèze
- Location within France Location within Auvergne-Rhône-Alpes
- Coordinates: 45°39′58″N 2°40′25″E
- Country: France
- Region: Auvergne-Rhône-Alpes
- Department: Puy-de-Dôme
- Arrondissement: Issoire
- Canton: Saint-Ours
- Intercommunality: Dômes Sancy Artense

Government
  - Mayor (2026–32): Yves Clamadieu
- Area^{1}: 29.09 km^{2} (11.23 sq mi)
- Highest elevation: 972 m (3,189 ft)
- Lowest elevation: 794 m (2,605 ft)
- Population (2023): 360
  - Density: 12/km^{2} (32/sq mi)
- Time zone: UTC+01:00 (CET)
  - Summer (DST): UTC+02:00 (CEST)
- INSEE/Postal code: 63370 /63820
- ^{1} French Land Register data, which excludes lakes, ponds, glaciers > 1 km^{2} (0.386 sq mi or 247 acres) and river estuaries.

Saint-Julien-Puy-Lavèze (French pronunciation: [sɛ̃ ʒyljɛ̃ pɥi lavɛz]) is a commune in the Puy-de-Dôme department in Auvergne in central France.

== See also ==
- Communes of the Puy-de-Dôme department
