= Saint-Jacques-d'Ambur =

- Commune
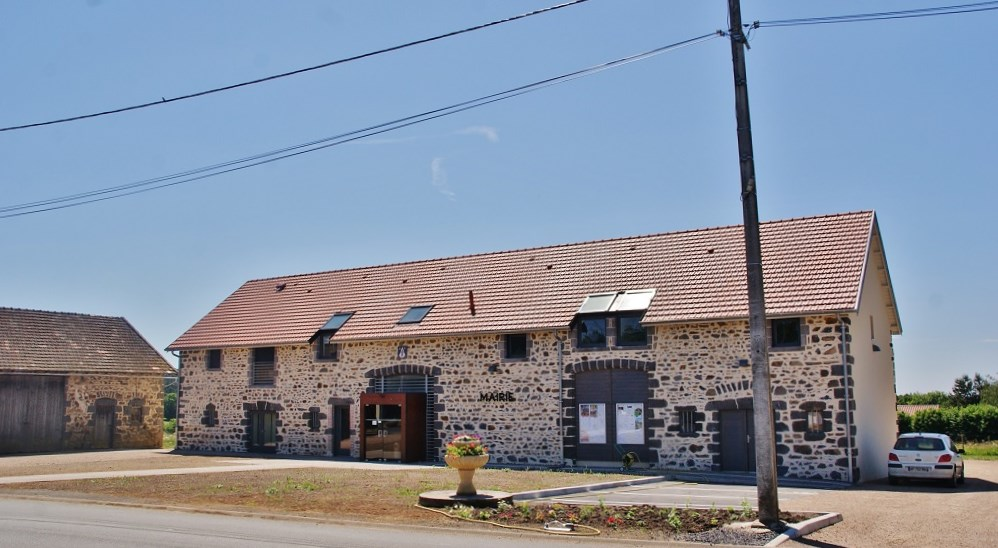
- The town hall in Saint-Jacques-d'Ambur

- Coat of arms
- Location of Saint-Jacques-d'Ambur
- Location within France Location within Auvergne-Rhône-Alpes
- Coordinates: 45°54′11″N 2°46′37″E
- Country: France
- Region: Auvergne-Rhône-Alpes
- Department: Puy-de-Dôme
- Arrondissement: Riom
- Canton: Saint-Ours
- Intercommunality: Chavanon Combrailles et Volcans

Government
  - Mayor (2026–32): Eliane Gardon
- Area^{1}: 20.40 km^{2} (7.88 sq mi)
- Highest elevation: 793 m (2,602 ft)
- Lowest elevation: 500 m (1,600 ft)
- Population (2023): 295
  - Density: 14.5/km^{2} (37.5/sq mi)
- Time zone: UTC+01:00 (CET)
  - Summer (DST): UTC+02:00 (CEST)
- INSEE/Postal code: 63363 /63230
- ^{1} French Land Register data, which excludes lakes, ponds, glaciers > 1 km^{2} (0.386 sq mi or 247 acres) and river estuaries.

Saint-Jacques-d'Ambur (French pronunciation: [sɛ̃ ʒak dɑ̃byʁ]) is a commune in the Puy-de-Dôme department in Auvergne in central France.

== See also ==
- Communes of the Puy-de-Dôme department
