= Savennes, Puy-de-Dôme =

Savennes
- Commune
- Location of Savennes
- Location within France Location within Auvergne-Rhône-Alpes
- Coordinates: 45°35′24″N 2°29′42″E
- Country: France
- Region: Auvergne-Rhône-Alpes
- Department: Puy-de-Dôme
- Arrondissement: Riom
- Canton: Saint-Ours
- Intercommunality: CC Chavanon Combrailles et Volcans

Government
  - Mayor (2020–2026): Audrey Manuby
- Area^{1}: 16.81 km^{2} (6.49 sq mi)
- Highest elevation: 786 m (2,579 ft)
- Lowest elevation: 538 m (1,765 ft)
- Population (2023): 96
  - Density: 5.7/km^{2} (15/sq mi)
- Time zone: UTC+01:00 (CET)
  - Summer (DST): UTC+02:00 (CEST)
- INSEE/Postal code: 63416 /63750
- ^{1} French Land Register data, which excludes lakes, ponds, glaciers > 1 km^{2} (0.386 sq mi or 247 acres) and river estuaries.

Savennes (French pronunciation: [savɛn]) is a commune in the Puy-de-Dôme department in Auvergne-Rhône-Alpes in central France.

== Geography ==
The Chavanon forms most of the commune's western border, then flows into the Dordogne.

== See also ==
- Communes of the Puy-de-Dôme department
