= Saint-Pardoux-le-Neuf, Corrèze =

Saint-Pardoux-le-Neuf
- Commune
- Coat of arms
- Location of Saint-Pardoux-le-Neuf
- Location within France Location within Nouvelle-Aquitaine
- Coordinates: 45°36′53″N 2°19′46″E
- Country: France
- Region: Nouvelle-Aquitaine
- Department: Corrèze
- Arrondissement: Ussel
- Canton: Ussel
- Intercommunality: Haute-Corrèze Communauté

Government
  - Mayor (2020–2026): Michel Bourzat
- Area^{1}: 10.54 km^{2} (4.07 sq mi)
- Elevation: 750 m (2,460 ft)
- Highest elevation: 845 m (2,772 ft)
- Lowest elevation: 650 m (2,130 ft)
- Population (2023): 83
  - Density: 7.9/km^{2} (20/sq mi)
- Time zone: UTC+01:00 (CET)
  - Summer (DST): UTC+02:00 (CEST)
- INSEE/Postal code: 19232 /19200
- ^{1} French Land Register data, which excludes lakes, ponds, glaciers > 1 km^{2} (0.386 sq mi or 247 acres) and river estuaries.

Saint-Pardoux-le-Neuf (French pronunciation: [sɛ̃ paʁdu lə nœf]; Occitan: Sent Pardós lo Nuòu) is a commune in the Corrèze department in central France.

== Population ==
Historical population
Year	Pop.	±% p.a.
1968	113	—
1975	90	−3.20%
1982	78	−2.02%
1990	88	+1.52%
1999	88	+0.00%
2007	66	−3.53%
2012	80	+3.92%
2017	76	−1.02%
2023	83	+1.48%
Source: INSEE

== See also ==
- Communes of the Corrèze department
