= Herment =

- Commune
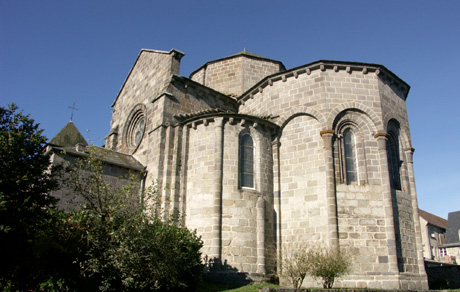
- The church in Herment

- Coat of arms
- Location of Herment
- Location within France Location within Auvergne-Rhône-Alpes
- Coordinates: 45°45′16″N 2°34′10″E
- Country: France
- Region: Auvergne-Rhône-Alpes
- Department: Puy-de-Dôme
- Arrondissement: Riom
- Canton: Saint-Ours
- Intercommunality: CC Chavanon Combrailles et Volcans

Government
  - Mayor (2026–32): Boris Souchal
- Area^{1}: 9.57 km^{2} (3.69 sq mi)
- Elevation: 823 m (2,700 ft)
- Highest elevation: 826 m (2,710 ft)
- Lowest elevation: 671 m (2,201 ft)
- Population (2023): 277
  - Density: 28.9/km^{2} (75.0/sq mi)
- Time zone: UTC+01:00 (CET)
  - Summer (DST): UTC+02:00 (CEST)
- INSEE/Postal code: 63175 /63470
- ^{1} French Land Register data, which excludes lakes, ponds, glaciers > 1 km^{2} (0.386 sq mi or 247 acres) and river estuaries.

Herment (French pronunciation: [ɛʁmɑ̃]; Occitan: l'Ermenc) is a commune in the Puy-de-Dôme department in Auvergne in central France.

== See also ==
- Communes of the Puy-de-Dôme department
