= Chavanon =

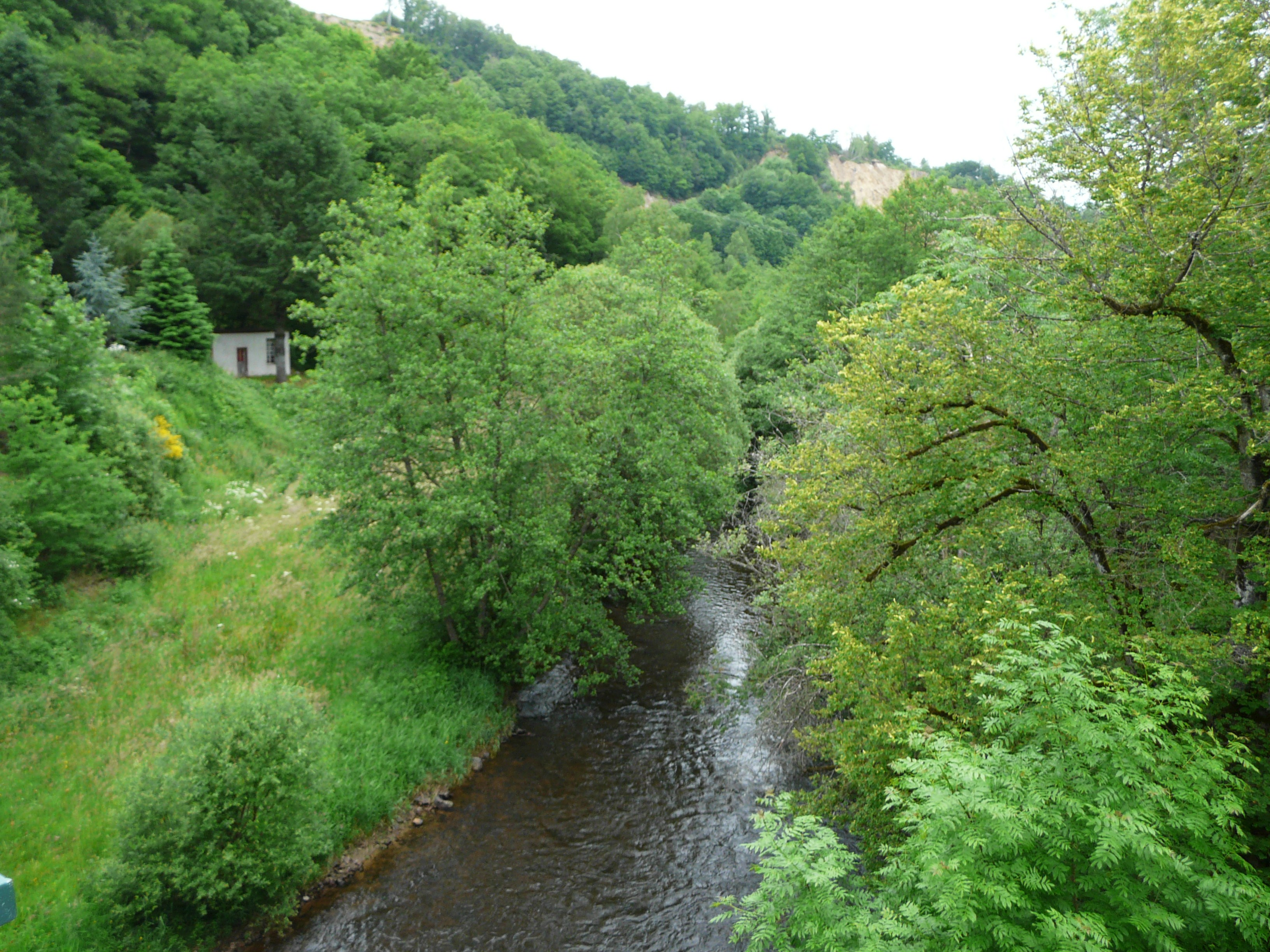
- The Chavanon between Feyt and Bourg-Lastic

- Location within France Location within Auvergne-Rhône-Alpes

Location
- Country: France

Physical characteristics
- Source
  - location: Crocq
  - coordinates: 45°50′26″N 02°22′40″E
  - elevation: 780 m (2,560 ft)
- Mouth
  - location: Dordogne
  - coordinates: 45°33′14″N 02°30′57″E
  - elevation: 530 m (1,740 ft)
- Length: 54.2 km (33.7 mi)
- Basin size: 474 km^{2} (183 sq mi)
- Discharge
  - average: 6.53 m^{3}/s (231 cu ft/s)

Basin features
- Progression: Dordogne→ Gironde estuary→ Atlantic Ocean

The Chavanon (French pronunciation: [ʃavanɔ̃]; Occitan: Chavanon) (also called la Ramade) is a 54.2-kilometre (33.7 mi) long river in the Creuse, Puy-de-Dôme, and Corrèze départements, central France. Its source is in Crocq. It flows generally southeast. It is a right tributary of the Dordogne into which it flows between Savennes and Confolent-Port-Dieu.

For most of its course, it forms part of the boundary between the Limousin and Auvergne regions.

== Départements and communes along its course ==
This list is ordered from source to mouth:

- Creuse: Crocq, Basville, Flayat
- Puy-de-Dôme: Fernoël, Giat,
- Creuse: Saint-Merd-la-Breuille,
- Puy-de-Dôme: Verneugheol,
- Corrèze: Laroche-près-Feyt,
- Puy-de-Dôme: Saint-Germain-près-Herment, Bourg-Lastic,
- Corrèze: Feyt, Monestier-Merlines,
- Puy-de-Dôme: Messeix,
- Corrèze: Merlines,
- Puy-de-Dôme: Savennes,
- Corrèze: Saint-Étienne-aux-Clos, Confolent-Port-Dieu,
