= Messeix =

- Commune
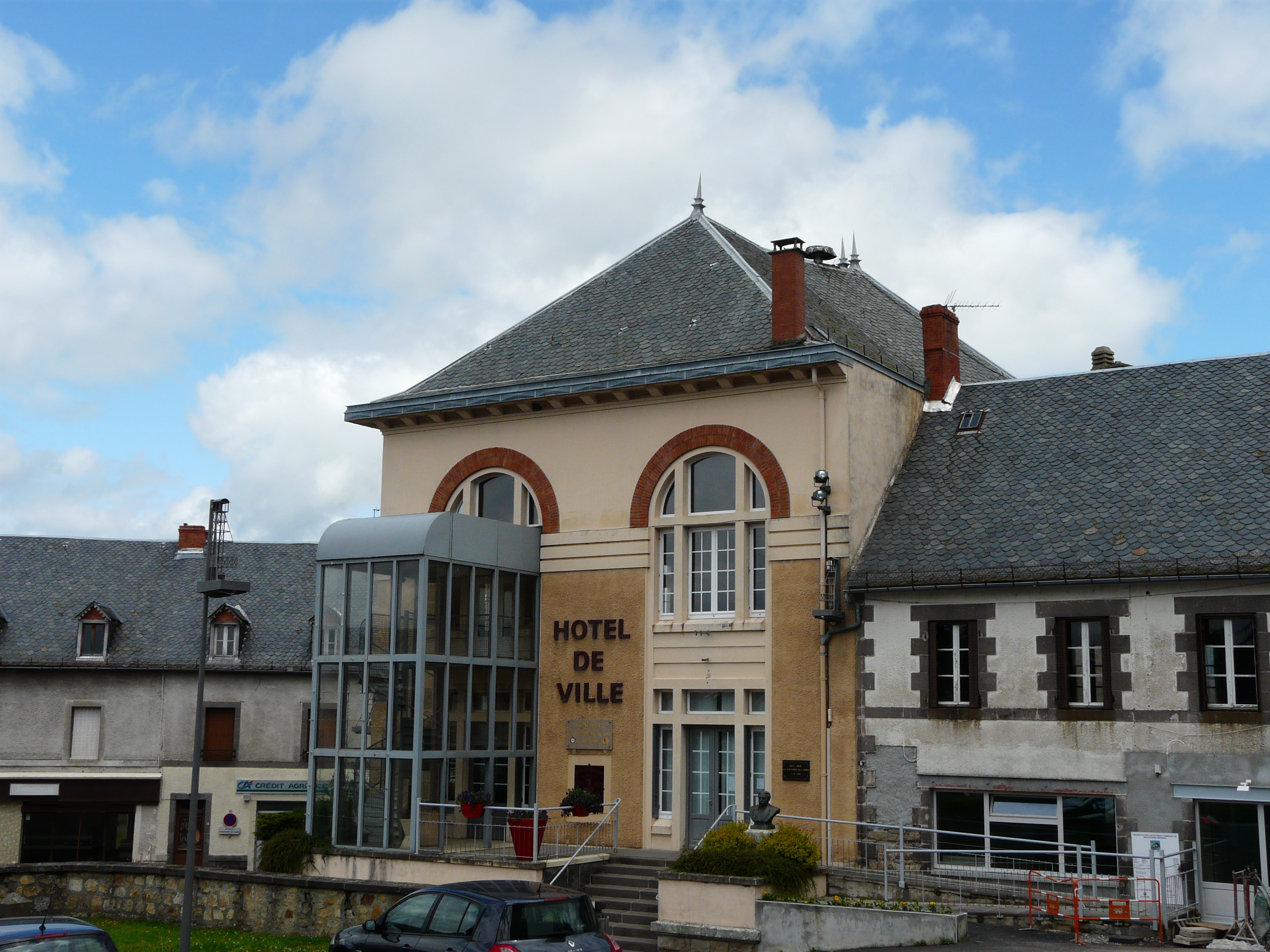
- The town hall in Messeix
- Location of Messeix
- Location within France Location within Auvergne-Rhône-Alpes
- Coordinates: 45°37′05″N 2°32′33″E
- Country: France
- Region: Auvergne-Rhône-Alpes
- Department: Puy-de-Dôme
- Arrondissement: Riom
- Canton: Saint-Ours
- Intercommunality: CC Chavanon Combrailles et Volcans

Government
  - Mayor (2020–2026): Jean-Pierre Turek
- Area^{1}: 39.32 km^{2} (15.18 sq mi)
- Elevation: 750 m (2,460 ft)
- Highest elevation: 863 m (2,831 ft)
- Lowest elevation: 570 m (1,870 ft)
- Population (2023): 998
  - Density: 25.4/km^{2} (65.7/sq mi)
- Time zone: UTC+01:00 (CET)
  - Summer (DST): UTC+02:00 (CEST)
- INSEE/Postal code: 63225 /63750
- ^{1} French Land Register data, which excludes lakes, ponds, glaciers > 1 km^{2} (0.386 sq mi or 247 acres) and river estuaries.

Messeix (French pronunciation: [məsɛ]) is a commune in the Puy-de-Dôme department in Auvergne in central France.

== Geography ==
The Chavanon forms the commune's north-western border.

== See also ==
- Communes of the Puy-de-Dôme department
