= Saint-Sulpice-les-Bois =

- Commune
- Coat of arms
- Location of Saint-Sulpice-les-Bois
- Location within France Location within Nouvelle-Aquitaine
- Coordinates: 45°36′58″N 2°08′47″E
- Country: France
- Region: Nouvelle-Aquitaine
- Department: Corrèze
- Arrondissement: Ussel
- Canton: Plateau de Millevaches
- Intercommunality: Haute-Corrèze Communauté

Government
  - Mayor (2020–2026): Nathalie Laurent
- Area^{1}: 22.92 km^{2} (8.85 sq mi)
- Elevation: 850 m (2,790 ft)
- Highest elevation: 956 m (3,136 ft)
- Lowest elevation: 723 m (2,372 ft)
- Population (2023): 76
  - Density: 3.3/km^{2} (8.6/sq mi)
- Time zone: UTC+01:00 (CET)
  - Summer (DST): UTC+02:00 (CEST)
- INSEE/Postal code: 19244 /19250
- ^{1} French Land Register data, which excludes lakes, ponds, glaciers > 1 km^{2} (0.386 sq mi or 247 acres) and river estuaries.

Saint-Sulpice-les-Bois (French pronunciation: [sɛ̃ sylpis le bwa]; Occitan: Sent-Saupesí, pronounced [ʃẽ ʃɔwpә'si]) is a commune in the Corrèze department in central France.

== Geography ==
The Triouzoune has its source in the northwestern part of the commune; it flows southeast through the commune and forms part of its southeastern boundary.

== History ==
The village was once called Taphaleschat. The name is derived from Taifals, a barbarian people (from Oltenia) settled in Gaul in the fifth century.

== Population ==
Historical population
Year	Pop.	±% p.a.
1968	101	—
1975	102	+0.14%
1982	79	−3.58%
1990	71	−1.33%
1999	53	−3.20%
2007	69	+3.35%
2012	75	+1.68%
2017	84	+2.29%
2023	76	−1.65%
Source: INSEE

== See also ==
- Communes of the Corrèze department
