= Canton of Plateau de Millevaches =

Coordinates: 45.54°N 2.15°E

The canton of Plateau de Millevaches is an administrative division of the Corrèze department, south-central France. It was created at the French canton reorganisation which came into effect in March 2015. Its seat is in Meymac.

It consists of the following communes:

1. Alleyrat
2. Ambrugeat
3. Bellechassagne
4. Bonnefond
5. Bugeat
6. Chavanac
7. Chaveroche
8. Combressol
9. Darnets
10. Davignac
11. Gourdon-Murat
12. Grandsaigne
13. Lestards
14. Lignareix
15. Maussac
16. Meymac
17. Millevaches
18. Péret-Bel-Air
19. Pérols-sur-Vézère
20. Peyrelevade
21. Pradines
22. Saint-Angel
23. Saint-Germain-Lavolps
24. Saint-Merd-les-Oussines
25. Saint-Pardoux-le-Vieux
26. Saint-Rémy
27. Saint-Setiers
28. Saint-Sulpice-les-Bois
29. Sornac
30. Soudeilles
31. Tarnac
32. Toy-Viam
33. Viam
