= Grandsaigne =

- Commune
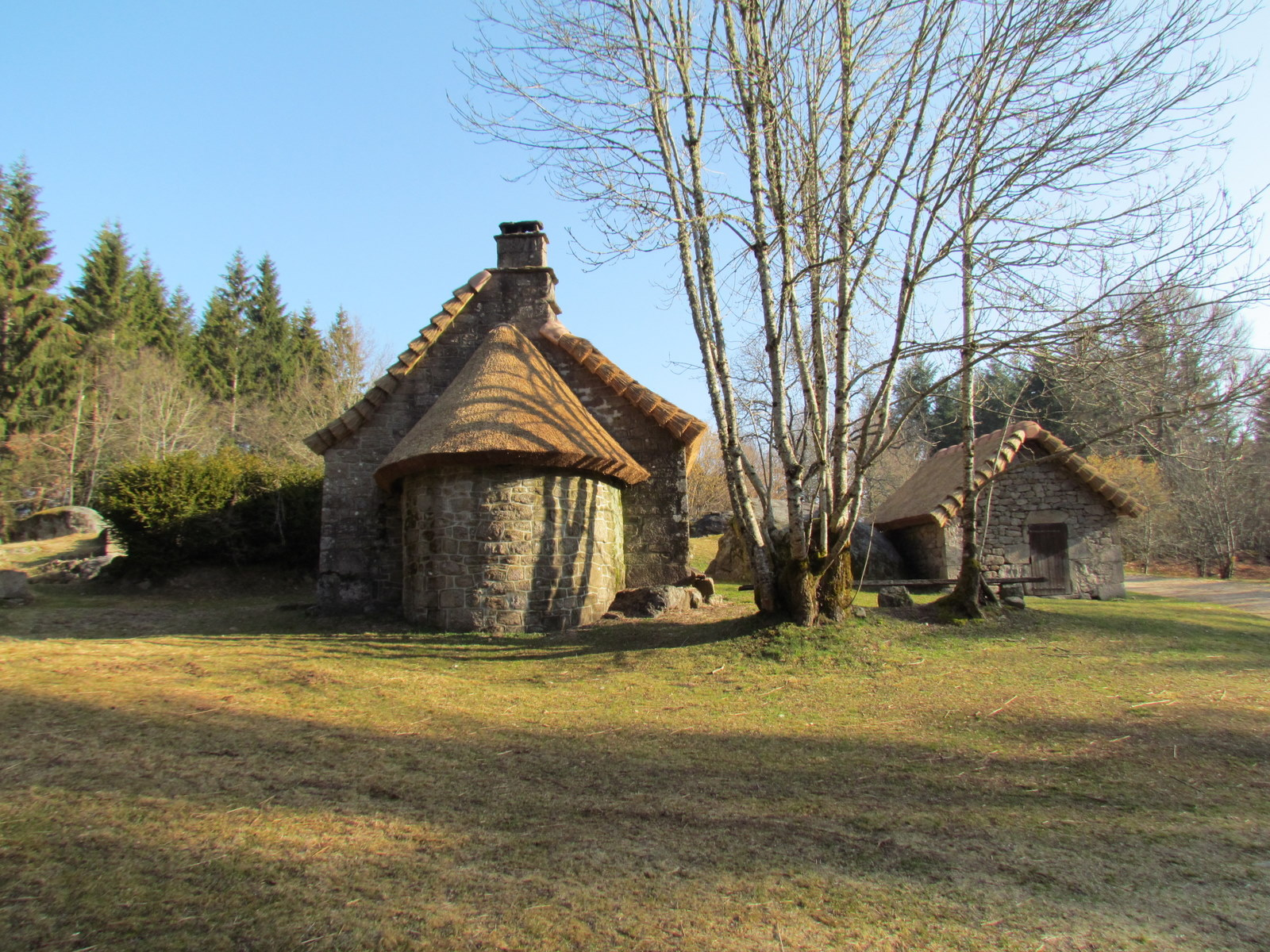
- The restored village of Clédat

- Coat of arms
- Location of Grandsaigne
- Location within France Location within Nouvelle-Aquitaine
- Coordinates: 45°29′28″N 1°55′08″E
- Country: France
- Region: Nouvelle-Aquitaine
- Department: Corrèze
- Arrondissement: Tulle
- Canton: Plateau de Millevaches

Government
  - Mayor (2020–2026): Jean-François Ensergueix
- Area^{1}: 19.92 km^{2} (7.69 sq mi)
- Highest elevation: 872 m (2,861 ft)
- Lowest elevation: 532 m (1,745 ft)
- Population (2023): 46
  - Density: 2.3/km^{2} (6.0/sq mi)
- Time zone: UTC+01:00 (CET)
  - Summer (DST): UTC+02:00 (CEST)
- INSEE/Postal code: 19088 /19300
- ^{1} French Land Register data, which excludes lakes, ponds, glaciers > 1 km^{2} (0.386 sq mi or 247 acres) and river estuaries.

Grandsaigne (French pronunciation: [ɡʁɑ̃sɛɲ]; Occitan: Grandsanha) is a commune in the Corrèze department of central France.

== Population ==
Historical population
Year	Pop.	±% p.a.
1968	134	—
1975	111	−2.65%
1982	87	−3.42%
1990	70	−2.68%
1999	58	−2.07%
2007	47	−2.59%
2012	45	−0.87%
2017	52	+2.93%
2023	46	−2.02%
Source: INSEE

== See also ==
- Communes of the Corrèze department
