= Ambrugeat =

- Commune
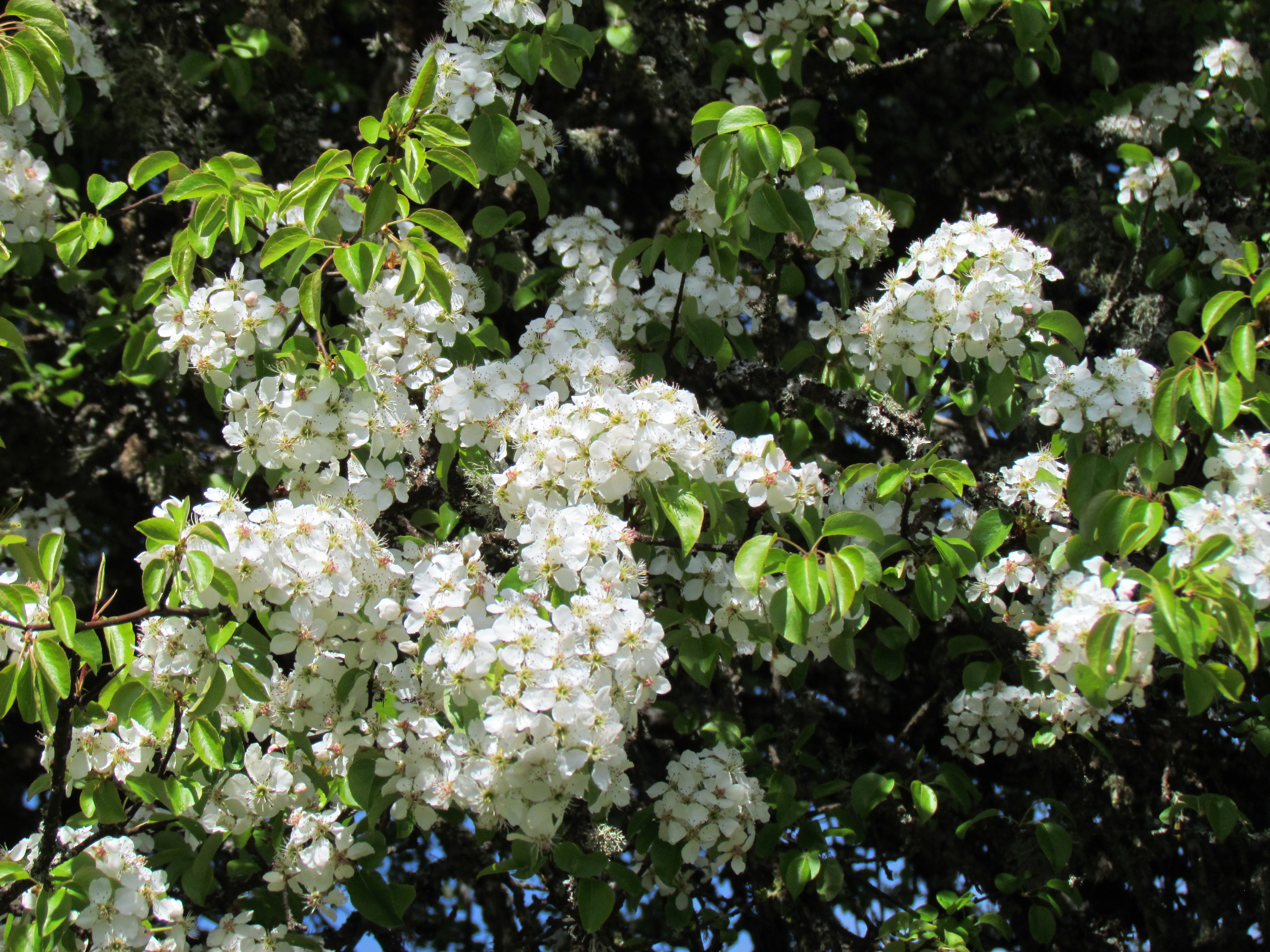
- Spring flowers in Ambrugeat

- Coat of arms
- Location of Ambrugeat
- Location within France Location within Nouvelle-Aquitaine
- Coordinates: 45°31′38″N 2°07′07″E
- Country: France
- Region: Nouvelle-Aquitaine
- Department: Corrèze
- Arrondissement: Ussel
- Canton: Plateau de Millevaches
- Intercommunality: Haute-Corrèze Communauté

Government
  - Mayor (2020–2026): Michel Saugeras
- Area^{1}: 29.57 km^{2} (11.42 sq mi)
- Highest elevation: 972 m (3,189 ft)
- Lowest elevation: 614 m (2,014 ft)
- Population (2023): 213
  - Density: 7.20/km^{2} (18.7/sq mi)
- Time zone: UTC+01:00 (CET)
  - Summer (DST): UTC+02:00 (CEST)
- INSEE/Postal code: 19008 /19250
- ^{1} French Land Register data, which excludes lakes, ponds, glaciers > 1 km^{2} (0.386 sq mi or 247 acres) and river estuaries.

Ambrugeat (French pronunciation: [ɑ̃bʁyʒa]; Occitan: Ambrujac) is a commune in the Corrèze department in the Nouvelle-Aquitaine region of central France.

== Geography ==
Ambrugeat is located some 80 km south-east of Limoges and immediately to the west of Meymac. It can be accessed by the D76 road from Meymac, which continues through the village then south-west to join the D16 north of Égletons. There is also the D123 minor road running north off the D76 passing through the western part of the commune. The D76E also runs off the D76 to the south-east to join the D36 road. The commune is largely forested with some farmland.

The village lies on the north-western shore of the Lac de Sechemaille whose shores form the eastern border at this point. Several streams rise in the commune and flow into the lake such as the Ruisseau de la Nauche, the Ruisseau de Laubard, and the Ruisseau des Farges. Other streams flow south through the western part of the commune to form the Ruisseau de Sautere.

== History ==
- 1308: The Bishop of Saint Leonard de Noblat put an end to quarrels between the two Ambrugeat priests.
- 1370: the entire Barsanges land was attached to the parish of Ambrugeat.
- 1436: Pierre de Coux was pastor prior for Ambrugeat.
- 1453: King Charles VII heightened Ambrugeat castle.
- 1502: Hugues de Beynette founded a vicarage at the altar of the Virgin and a community of fifteen priests were moved to Beynat in Ambrugeat.
- 1554: François Granier was prior of Ambrugeat.
- 1558: a survey of the commune was carried out.
- 1592: King Henry IV was supported by the lord of Ambrugeat.
- 1598: research was done on the titles of the nobility of Ambrugeat.
- 1599: Murat Antoine was Curé of Ambrugeat
- 1647: Gilbert du Boucheron sells the rental property rights for the high, low, and middle for the village of Besse in Ambrugeat.

=== Heraldry ===
Arms of Ambrugeat	Blazon: Or, three lions gules posed 2 and 1.

== Administration ==
List of Successive Mayors

From	To	Name	Party
1983	1995	Roger Brette	
1995	2008	Jean-Claude Niéras	PCF
2008	2026	Michel Saugeras	

== Demography ==
The inhabitants of the commune are known as Ambrugeacois or Ambrugeacoises in French.

Historical population

Year	Pop.	±% p.a.
1793	625	—
1800	592	−0.77%
1806	704	+2.93%
1821	716	+0.11%
1831	793	+1.03%
1836	791	−0.05%
1841	837	+1.14%
1846	912	+1.73%
1851	947	+0.76%
1856	978	+0.65%
1861	1,025	+0.94%
1866	1,018	−0.14%
1872	1,019	+0.02%
1876	1,021	+0.05%
1881	1,060	+0.75%
1886	1,188	+2.31%
1891	1,125	−1.08%
1896	1,144	+0.34%
1901	1,108	−0.64%

Year	Pop.	±% p.a.
1906	1,109	+0.02%
1911	1,074	−0.64%
1921	950	−1.22%
1926	871	−1.72%
1931	875	+0.09%
1936	927	+1.16%
1946	614	−4.04%
1954	365	−6.29%
1962	305	−2.22%
1968	270	−2.01%
1975	204	−3.93%
1982	192	−0.86%
1990	184	−0.53%
1999	216	+1.80%
2007	208	−0.47%
2012	200	−0.78%
2017	205	+0.50%
2023	213	+0.64%

Source: EHESS and INSEE

== Culture and heritage ==
=== Civil heritage ===
The commune has a number of buildings and structures that are registered as historical monuments:

- A Farmhouse (1) at Laubard (1802)
- A Farmhouse (2) at Laubard (1811)
- A Bread Oven at Laubard (19th century)
- A Bread Oven at Lassagne (19th century)
- A Farmhouse at Lafond (1663). The Farmhouse contains a pair of Andirons with hobs (19th century) which are registered as an historical object.
- A Farmhouse at Besse (1662)
- The Chateau of Ambrugeat (16th century) is at the entrance to the town. It was built as a fortified farm in 1448 by Charles VII.
- Mills (18th-19th century)
- Farmhouses (17th-20th century)

Other sites of interest

- A very old Stone Trough attached to the Chassagnac house at Beynat. Marius Vazeilles, a local scholar, said that the washing-trough is very old.
- In the same village, there are two other notable troughs. The second is located in the bread oven, a very old construction in the Madesclaire-Aumarchad house. The third is on the terrace of the Cheze Sailly Chassagnac families' house. This trough, in granite, has a diameter of 0.90 m and a height of 0.95 m round and is entirely hand carved. It is clearly a very old piece of undeniable archaeological value.

=== Religious heritage ===
The commune has several religious buildings and structures that are registered as historical monuments:

- The Calvary of Besse (1623)
- A Monumental Cross at Laubard (17th century)
- A Monumental Cross at Lassagne (20th century)
- A Monumental Cross at Besse (1623)
- A Monumental Cross (1899)
- A Presbytery (19th century)
- The Parish Church of Saint Salvy and Saint Martin (13th century) with its triangular gabled bell tower and three arched bays from the 16th century is at the centre of the village. Inside the church behind the altar is a large altarpiece from the 18th century.
- Monumental Crosses (17th-20th century)

The Parish Church contains many items that are registered as historical objects:

- The Furniture in the Church
- 2 Bronze Bells (1784)
- A Commemorative plaque: obituary of Gilbert du Boucheron (1660)
- 2 Decorative Vases (19th century)
- A Processional Banner (19th century)
- An Ex-voto of the House of Lorette (19th century)
- A Reliquary-Monstrance of Saint Vincent de Paul (1865)
- A Sunburst Monstrance (19th century)
- A Ciborium (1819-1838)
- 3 Patens (19th century)
- 2 Chalices (1819-1838)
- A Statue: Saint Salvy (19th century)
- A Statue: Saint Salvy (15th century)
- A Statue: Virgin and child (19th century)
- A Statuette: Saint Theresa of Lisieux (20th century)
- A Sacristy Cross: Christ on the Cross (19th century)
- 2 Statues: Saint Martin and Saint Salvy (18th century)
- A Baptismal font enclosure (18th century)
- The Saint Salvy Altar, Altar seating, Tabernacle, and Retable (17th century)
- The Virgin Altar, Altar seating, Tabernacle, and Retable (17th century)
- The main Altar, Altar seating, Tabernacle, Retable, and Altar paintings (17th century)
- A Capital (13th century)

=== Picture Gallery ===
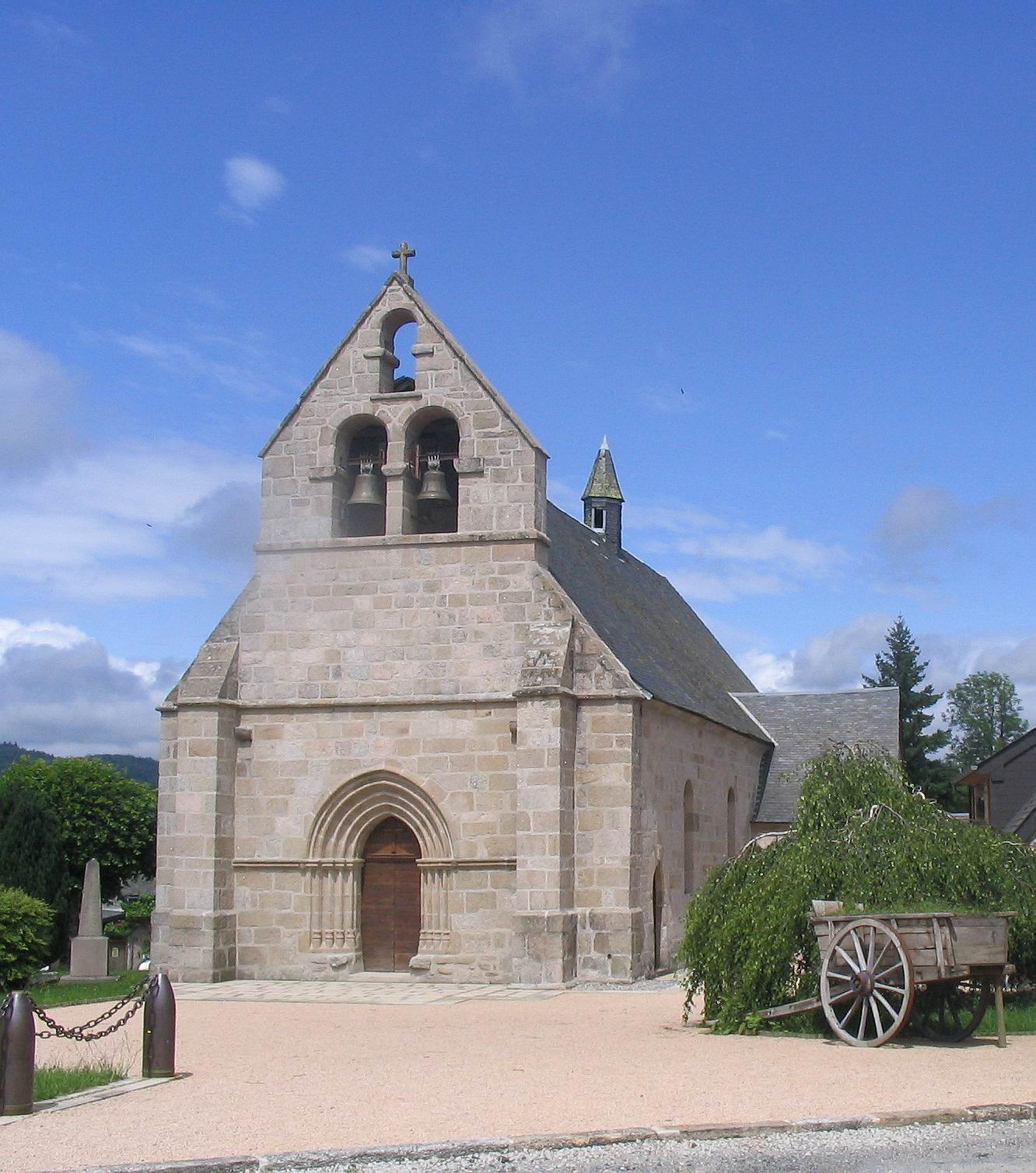
Church of St. Eloi and St. Martin

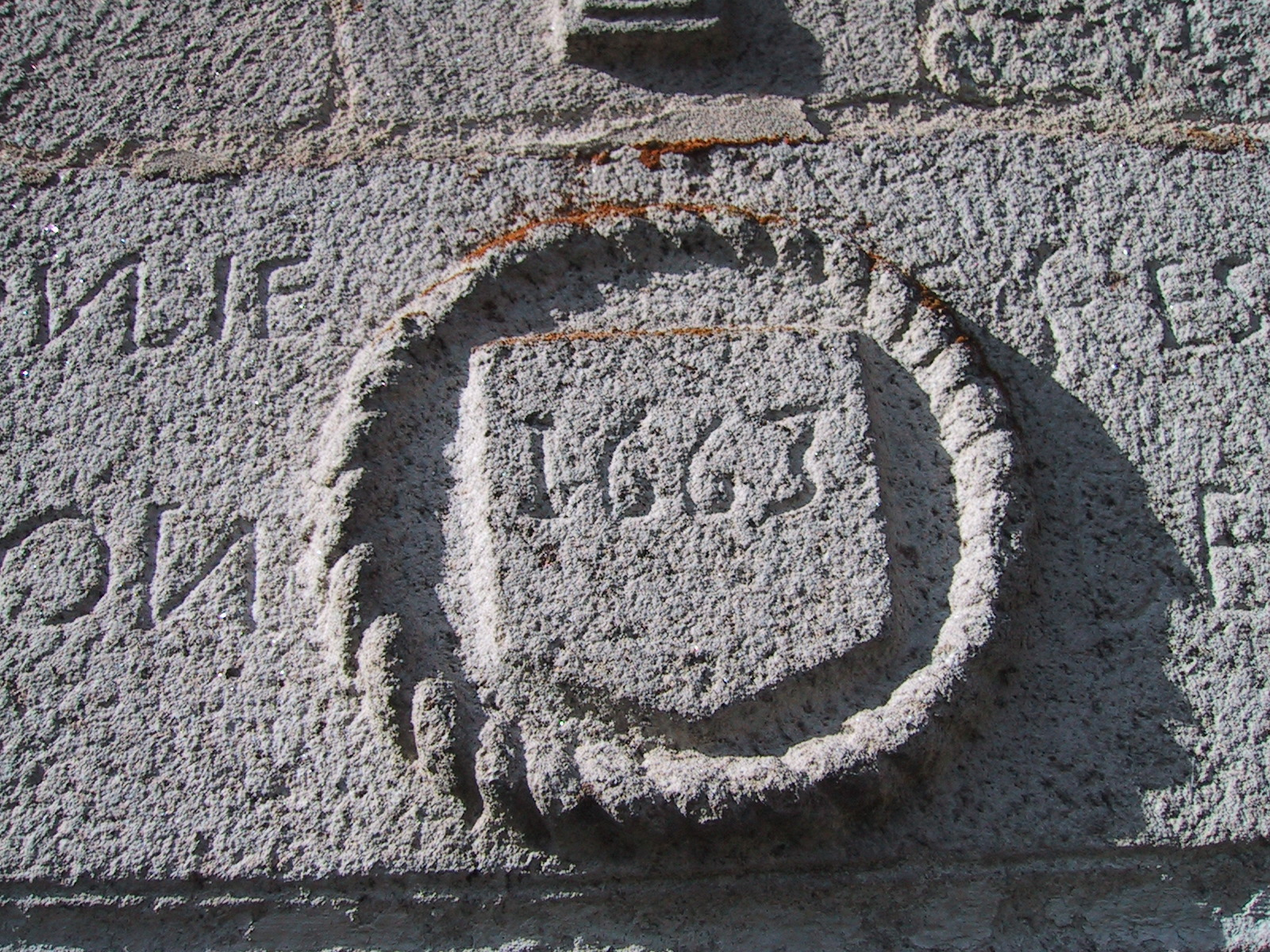
Lintel from the 17th century (Mazaud House at Besse)

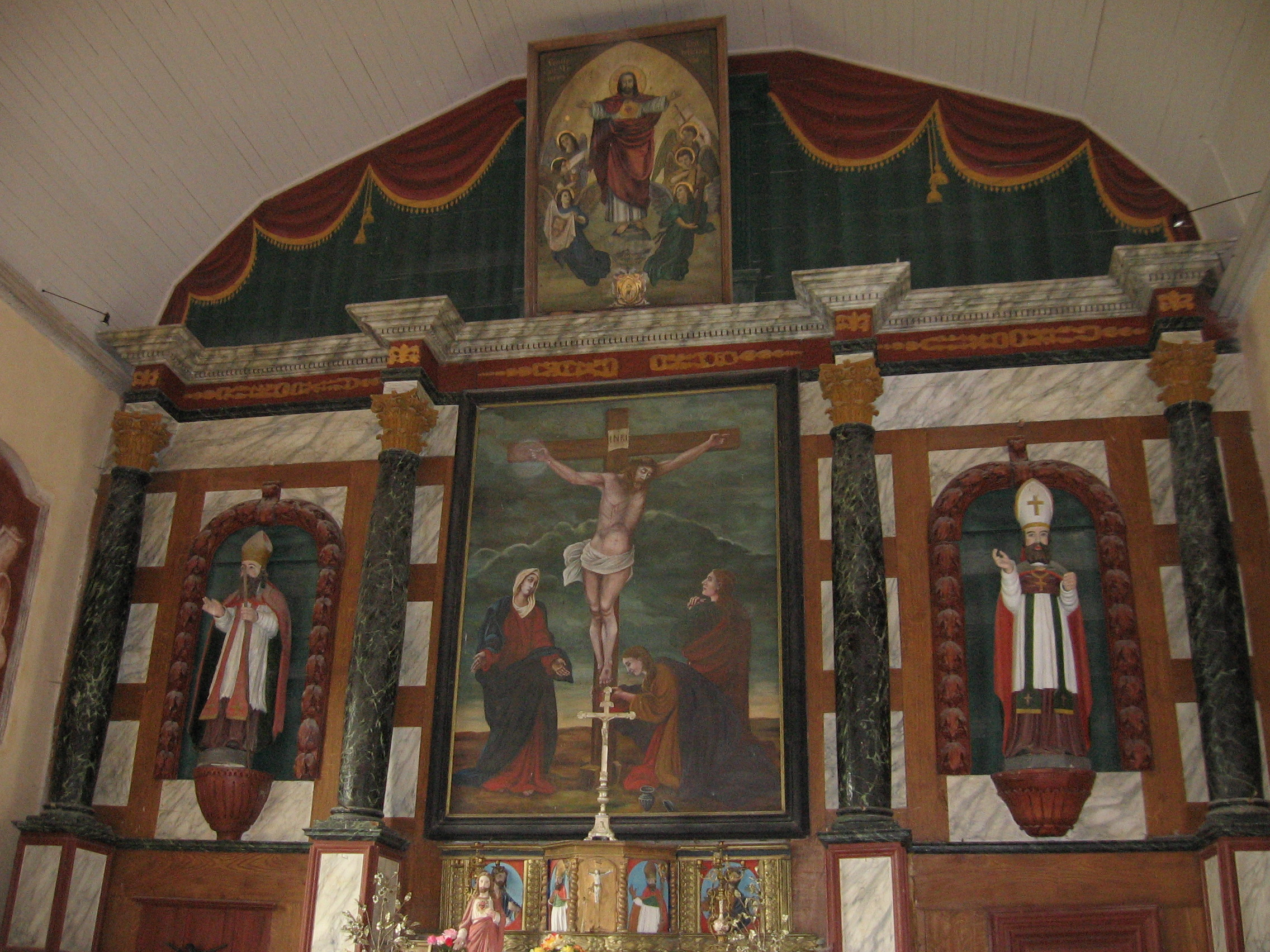
Altar from the 18th century

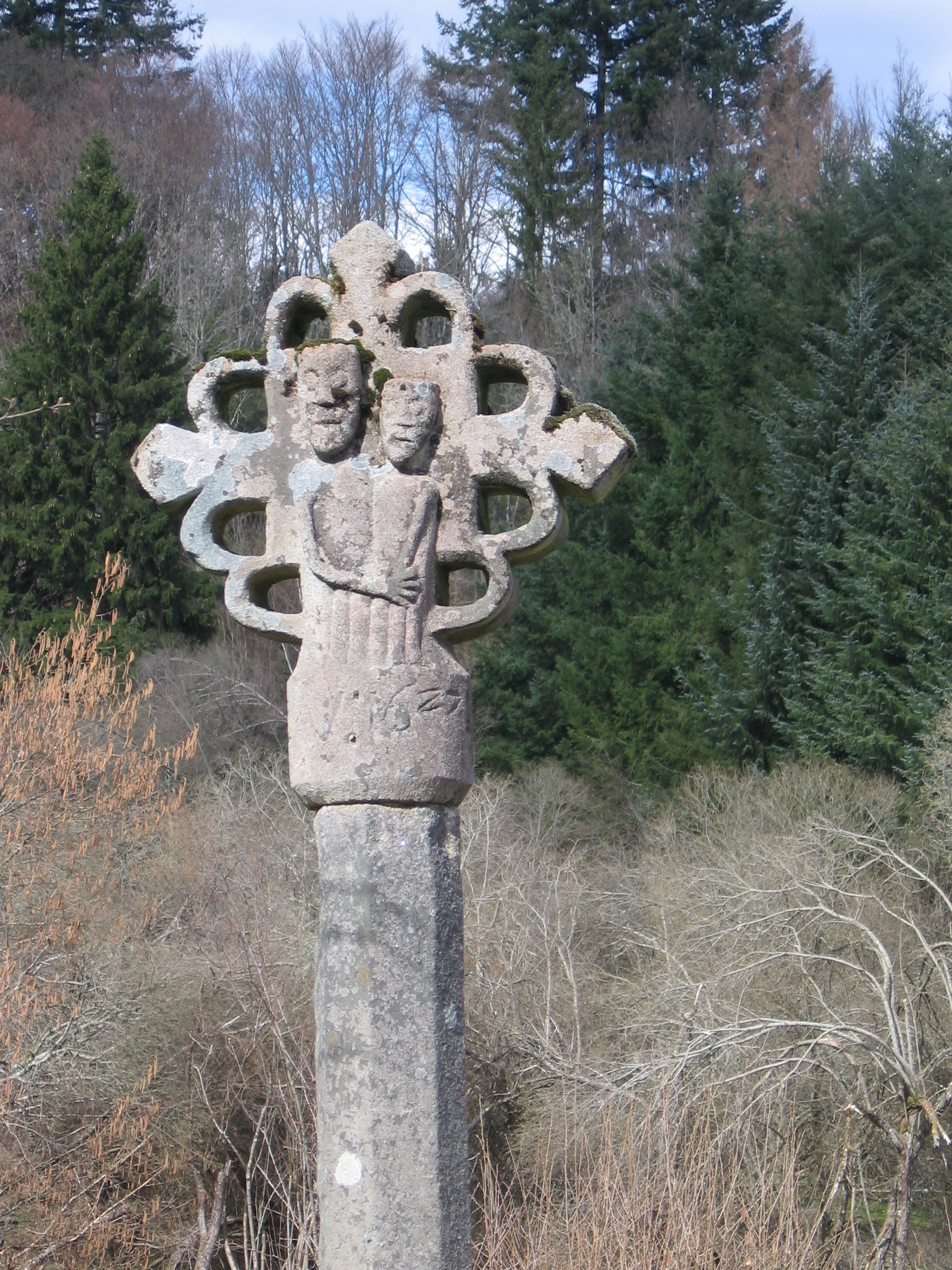
Besse hamlet cross

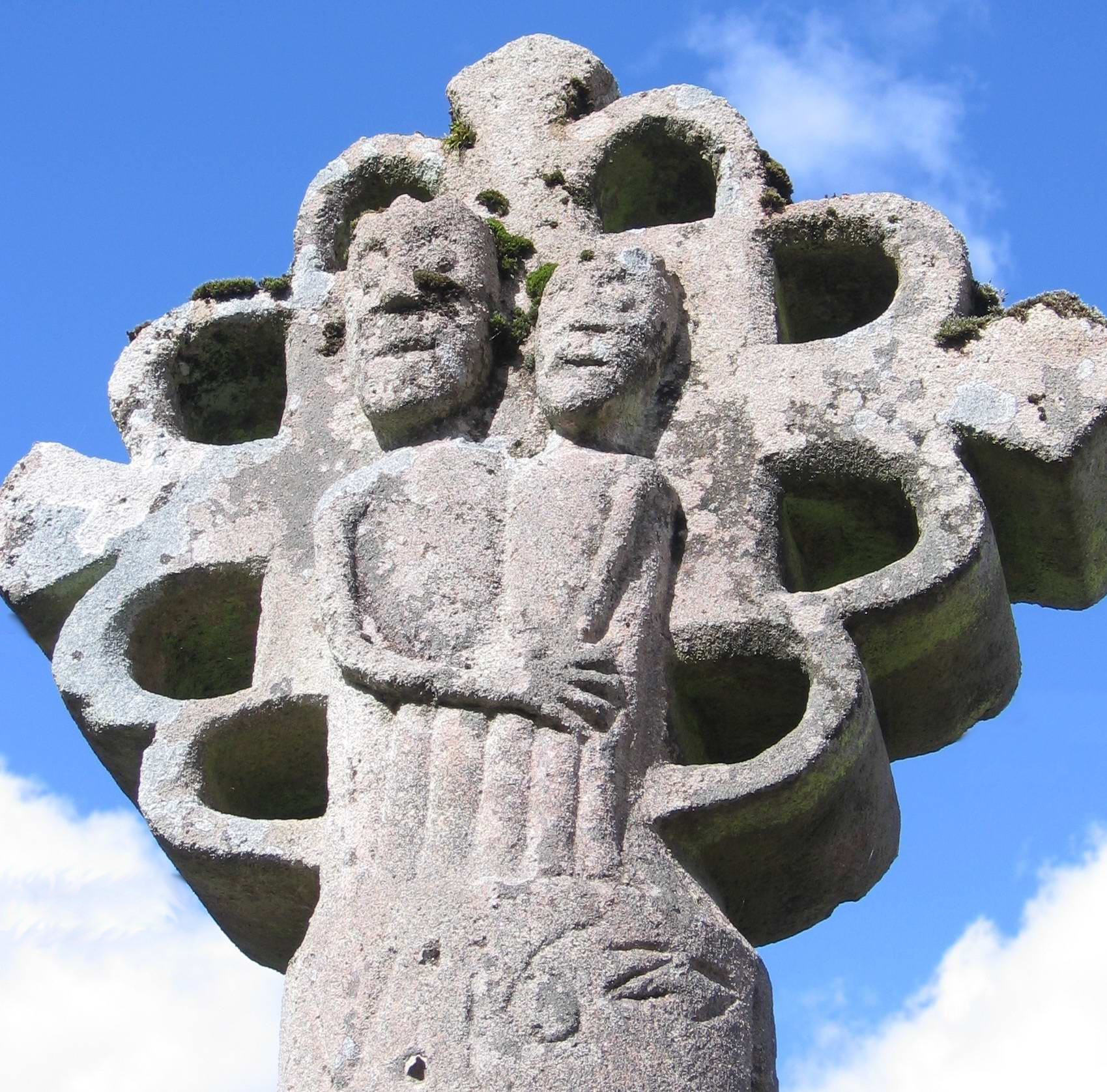
Besse Cross (detail)

== Notable people linked to the commune ==
- Martial Brigouleix, a resistance fighter born on 24 April 1903 at Ambrugeat and shot on 2 October 1943 at Mont-Valerien
- André Desassis (known as "Darius"), a resistance fighter born in 1920 in the village of Lassagne and died in April 1944 after an unpleasant imprisonment at Limoges. He set up contact with Georges Guingouin as a basis for the first FTP (Francs-tireurs et partisans) troops. A monument was erected to his memory on the town square in Ambrugeat and a ceremony is held every Easter Monday to recall his commitment: in particular the National Association of Veterans of the Resistance (ANACR) and the mayor of the commune.
- Bernard Mazaud, painter and former resistance fighter

== See also ==
- Communes of the Corrèze department
