= Saint-Hilaire-Luc =

- Commune
- Coat of arms
- Location of Saint-Hilaire-Luc
- Location within France Location within Nouvelle-Aquitaine
- Coordinates: 45°21′47″N 2°12′18″E
- Country: France
- Region: Nouvelle-Aquitaine
- Department: Corrèze
- Arrondissement: Ussel
- Canton: Haute-Dordogne
- Intercommunality: Haute-Corrèze Communauté

Government
  - Mayor (2020–2026): Barbara Vimon
- Area^{1}: 10.84 km^{2} (4.19 sq mi)
- Elevation: 630 m (2,070 ft)
- Highest elevation: 641 m (2,103 ft)
- Lowest elevation: 398 m (1,306 ft)
- Population (2023): 65
  - Density: 6.0/km^{2} (16/sq mi)
- Time zone: UTC+01:00 (CET)
  - Summer (DST): UTC+02:00 (CEST)
- INSEE/Postal code: 19210 /19160
- ^{1} French Land Register data, which excludes lakes, ponds, glaciers > 1 km^{2} (0.386 sq mi or 247 acres) and river estuaries.

Saint-Hilaire-Luc (French pronunciation: [sɛ̃.t‿ilɛʁ lyk]; Occitan: Sent Alari al Luc) is a commune in the Corrèze department in central France.

== Population ==
Historical population
| Year | Pop. | ±% p.a. |
|---|---|---|
| 1968 | 103 | — |
| 1975 | 90 | −1.91% |
| 1982 | 91 | +0.16% |
| 1990 | 88 | −0.42% |
| 1999 | 87 | −0.13% |
| 2007 | 78 | −1.36% |
| 2012 | 78 | +0.00% |
| 2017 | 70 | −2.14% |
| 2023 | 65 | −1.23% |
Source: INSEE

== See also ==
- Communes of the Corrèze department
