= Darnets =

- Commune
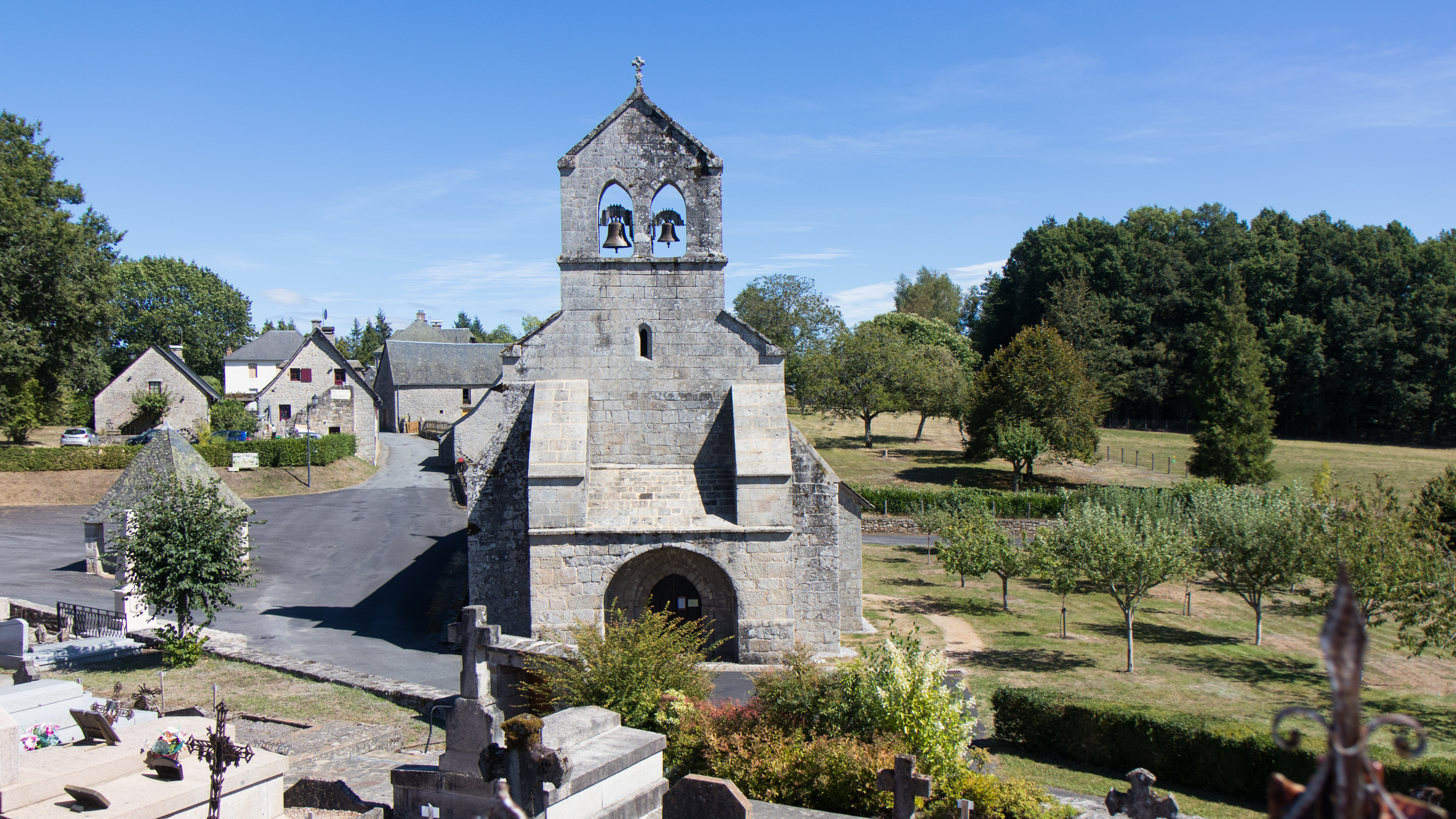
- The church of Saint-Maurice, in Darnets

- Coat of arms
- Location of Darnets
- Location within France Location within Nouvelle-Aquitaine
- Coordinates: 45°25′37″N 2°06′42″E
- Country: France
- Region: Nouvelle-Aquitaine
- Department: Corrèze
- Arrondissement: Ussel
- Canton: Plateau de Millevaches

Government
  - Mayor (2020–2026): Philippe Rossignol
- Area^{1}: 25.42 km^{2} (9.81 sq mi)
- Highest elevation: 663 m (2,175 ft)
- Lowest elevation: 471 m (1,545 ft)
- Population (2023): 303
  - Density: 11.9/km^{2} (30.9/sq mi)
- Time zone: UTC+01:00 (CET)
  - Summer (DST): UTC+02:00 (CEST)
- INSEE/Postal code: 19070 /19300
- ^{1} French Land Register data, which excludes lakes, ponds, glaciers > 1 km^{2} (0.386 sq mi or 247 acres) and river estuaries.

Darnets (French pronunciation: [daʁnɛ]) is a commune in the Corrèze department in central France.

== Geography ==
The Luzège forms the commune's eastern border.

== Population ==
Historical population
Year	Pop.	±% p.a.
1968	283	—
1975	279	−0.20%
1982	321	+2.02%
1990	304	−0.68%
1999	341	+1.28%
2007	343	+0.07%
2012	355	+0.69%
2017	361	+0.34%
2023	303	−2.88%
Source: INSEE

== See also ==
- Communes of the Corrèze department
