= Soudeilles =

- Commune
- Coat of arms
- Location of Soudeilles
- Location within France Location within Nouvelle-Aquitaine
- Coordinates: 45°26′47″N 2°04′45″E
- Country: France
- Region: Nouvelle-Aquitaine
- Department: Corrèze
- Arrondissement: Ussel
- Canton: Plateau de Millevaches

Government
  - Mayor (2020–2026): Jean-François Lafon
- Area^{1}: 20.39 km^{2} (7.87 sq mi)
- Highest elevation: 851 m (2,792 ft)
- Lowest elevation: 533 m (1,749 ft)
- Population (2023): 299
  - Density: 14.7/km^{2} (38.0/sq mi)
- Time zone: UTC+01:00 (CET)
  - Summer (DST): UTC+02:00 (CEST)
- INSEE/Postal code: 19263 /19300
- ^{1} French Land Register data, which excludes lakes, ponds, glaciers > 1 km^{2} (0.386 sq mi or 247 acres) and river estuaries.

Soudeilles (French pronunciation: [sudɛj]; Occitan: Sodelhas) is a commune in the Corrèze department in central France.

== Population ==
Historical population
| Year | Pop. | ±% p.a. |
|---|---|---|
| 1968 | 331 | — |
| 1975 | 315 | −0.71% |
| 1982 | 299 | −0.74% |
| 1990 | 289 | −0.42% |
| 1999 | 272 | −0.67% |
| 2007 | 286 | +0.63% |
| 2012 | 303 | +1.16% |
| 2017 | 301 | −0.13% |
| 2023 | 299 | −0.11% |
Source: INSEE

== See also ==
- Communes of the Corrèze department
