= Saint-Merd-les-Oussines =

- Commune
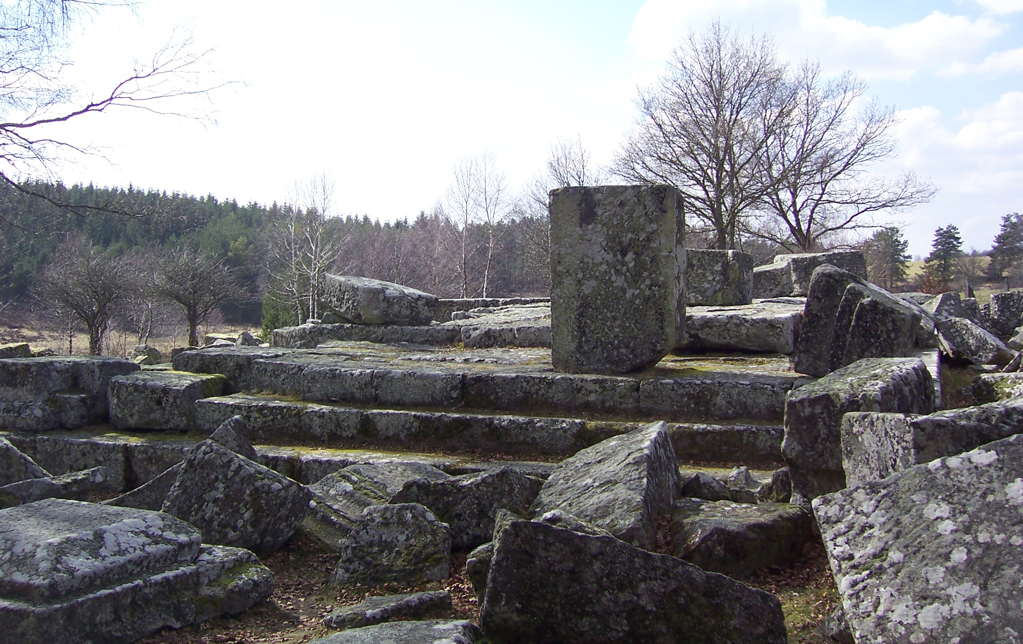
- The Gallo-Roman ruins of Cars, in Saint-Merd-les-Oussines

- Coat of arms
- Location of Saint-Merd-les-Oussines
- Location within France Location within Nouvelle-Aquitaine
- Coordinates: 45°38′00″N 2°02′27″E
- Country: France
- Region: Nouvelle-Aquitaine
- Department: Corrèze
- Arrondissement: Ussel
- Canton: Plateau de Millevaches
- Intercommunality: Haute-Corrèze Communauté

Government
  - Mayor (2020–2026): Baptiste Galland
- Area^{1}: 42.46 km^{2} (16.39 sq mi)
- Elevation: 815 m (2,674 ft)
- Highest elevation: 934 m (3,064 ft)
- Lowest elevation: 731 m (2,398 ft)
- Population (2023): 105
  - Density: 2.47/km^{2} (6.40/sq mi)
- Time zone: UTC+01:00 (CET)
  - Summer (DST): UTC+02:00 (CEST)
- INSEE/Postal code: 19226 /19170
- ^{1} French Land Register data, which excludes lakes, ponds, glaciers > 1 km^{2} (0.386 sq mi or 247 acres) and river estuaries.

Saint-Merd-les-Oussines (French pronunciation: [sɛ̃ mɛʁ le.z‿usin]; Occitan: Sent Merd las Aussinas) is a commune in the Corrèze department in central France. The inhabitants of Saint-Merd-les-Oussines are called Saint-Mercantois and Saint-Mercantoises.

== Toponymy ==
Around 1315, the name of the town was Sancti Medardi de Chabanes before becoming Saint Merd les Aussines in Bas-Limousin and then Saint-Merd-les-Oussines.

- Saint Merd is the deformation of Saint Médard de Noyon,
- Oussines, from the old Occitan absina (uncultivated land), and in Occitan from the Lower Limousin aussar which means "to neglect, when speaking of a field that is left uncultivated".

== Geography ==
Commune of the Massif Central located in the typical site of the Millevaches plateau. The village sits at an altitude of 748m. There are moors and woods of beech and conifers. Commune watered by the Vézère, the Petite Vézère (or Ars river) and its tributary, the Ruisseau des Maisons.

== Population ==
Historical population
Year	Pop.	±% p.a.
1968	180	—
1975	153	−2.29%
1982	137	−1.57%
1990	114	−2.27%
1999	112	−0.20%
2007	119	+0.76%
2012	131	+1.94%
2017	129	−0.31%
2023	105	−3.37%
Source: INSEE

== Places and monuments ==
The town has three historical monuments :

- The Gallo-Roman ruins of Les Cars - a villa and funerary monuments. Excavations and enhancement by Marius Vazeilles. Objects from the ruins can be found at the Vazeilles Museum in Meymac. The remains were classified by decree of 11 September 1935.
- The old presbytery, built in the 17th-centuary, listed by decree of 13 December 1978.
- A medieval tomb, adjoining the church, listed by decree of 13 April 1929.
- Church Saint-Médard de Saint-Merd-les-Oussines. It is listed in the General Inventory of Cultural Heritage. In addition, in the parish church, there is the recumbent statue of Saint-Merd-les-Oussines, classified as an historical object by decree of 5 September 1969.
La chapelle Notre-Dame du hameau de Fournol

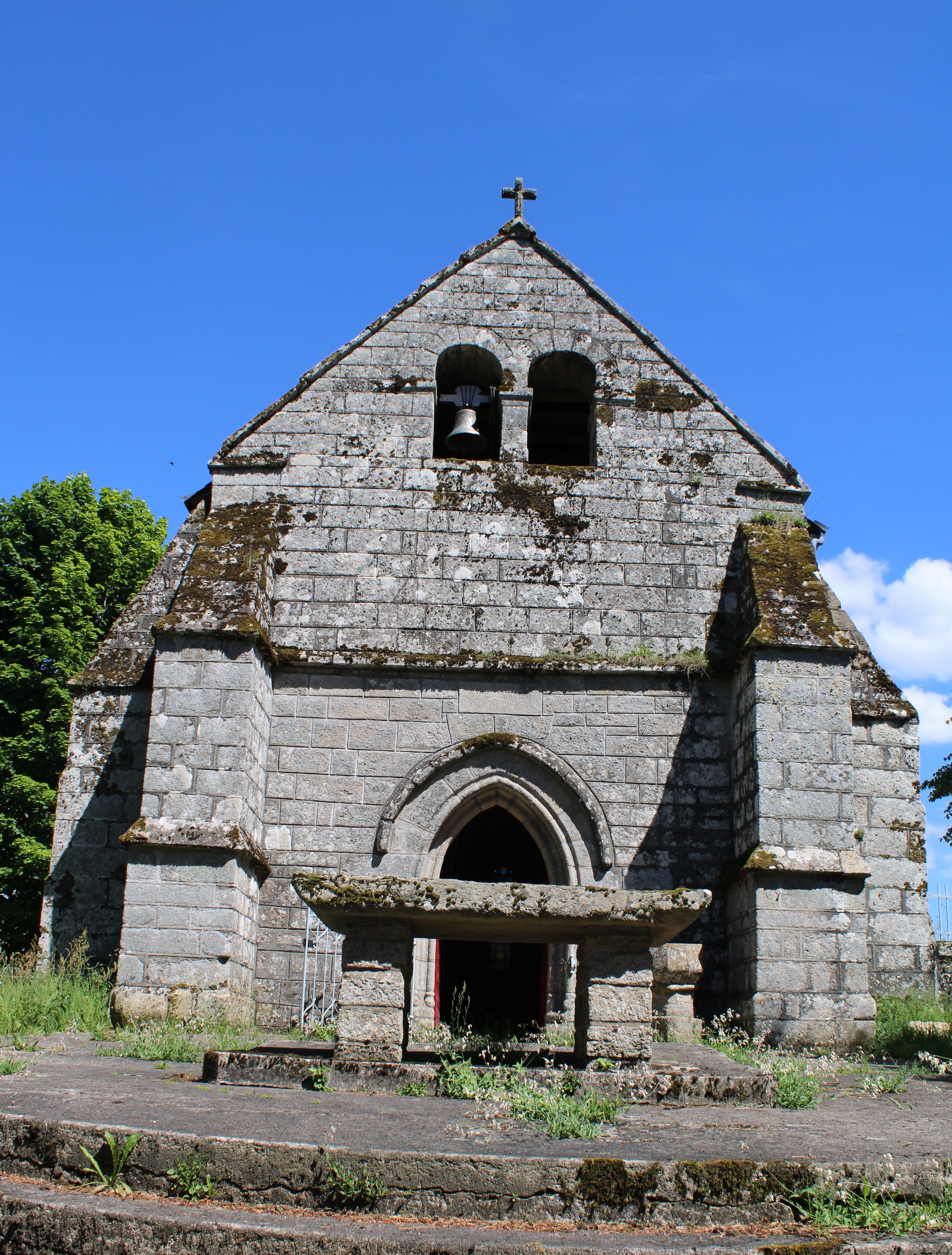
The façade and the exterior altar.

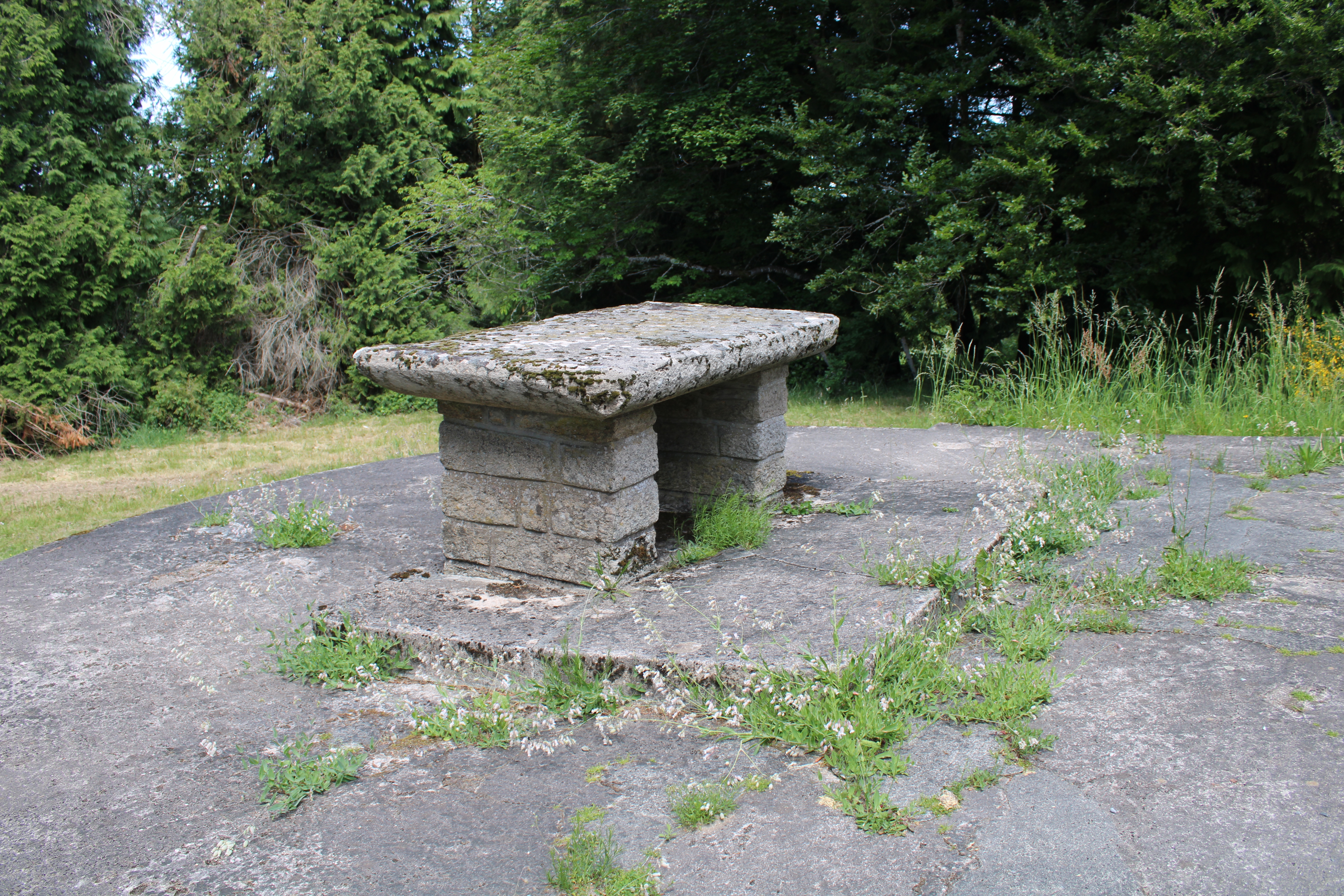
The outer altar.

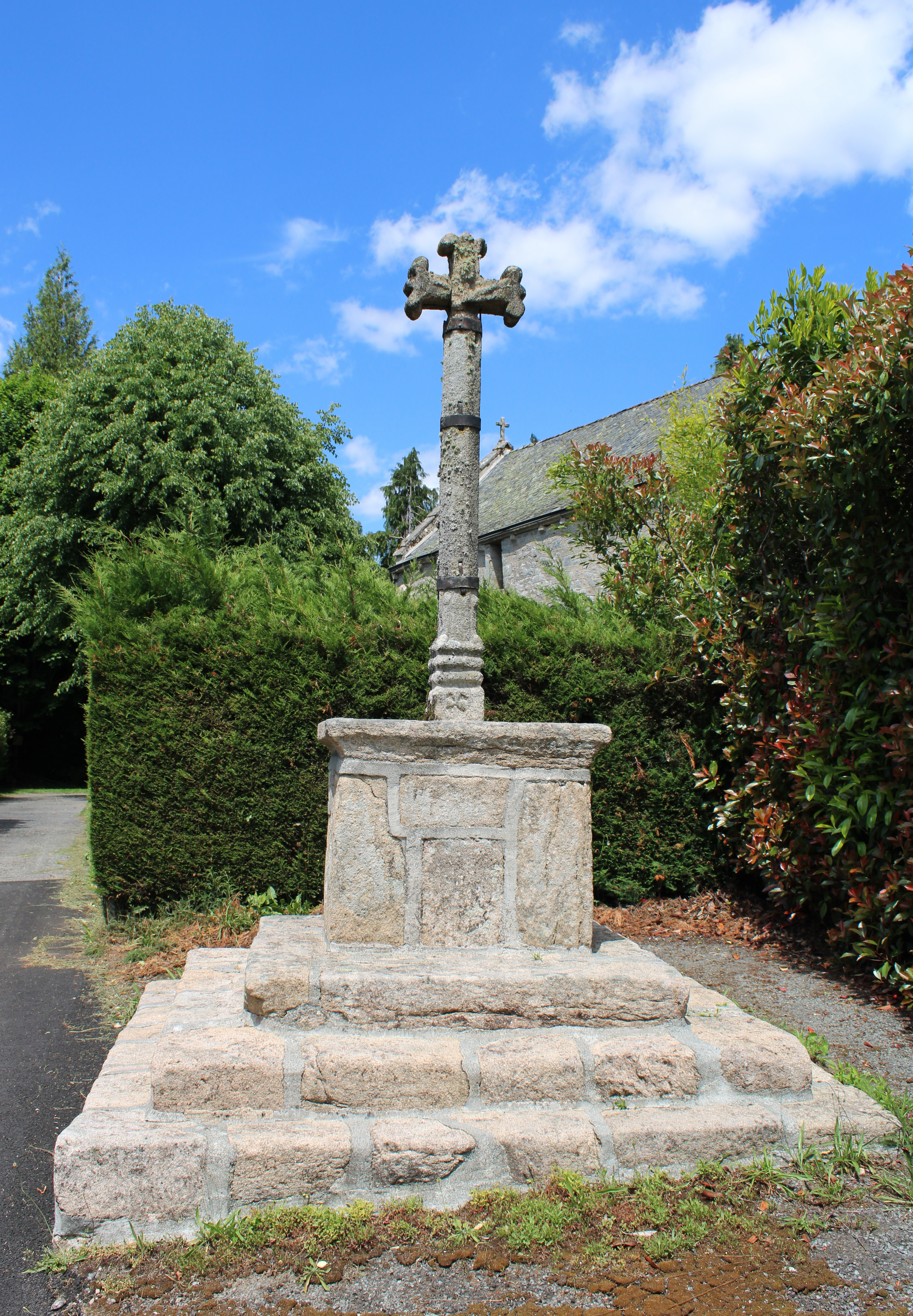
The calvaire.

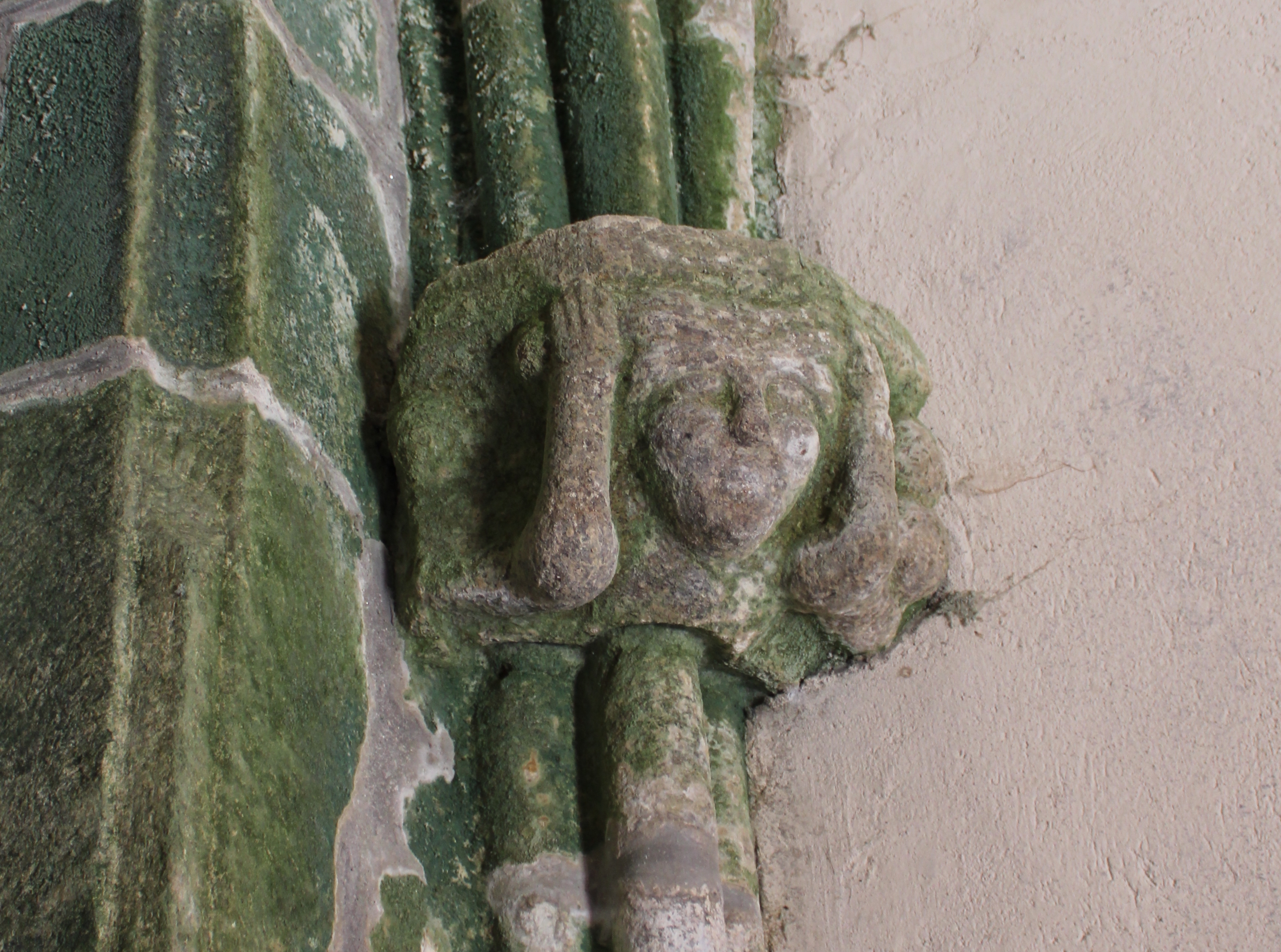
Sculpted cul-de-lampe.

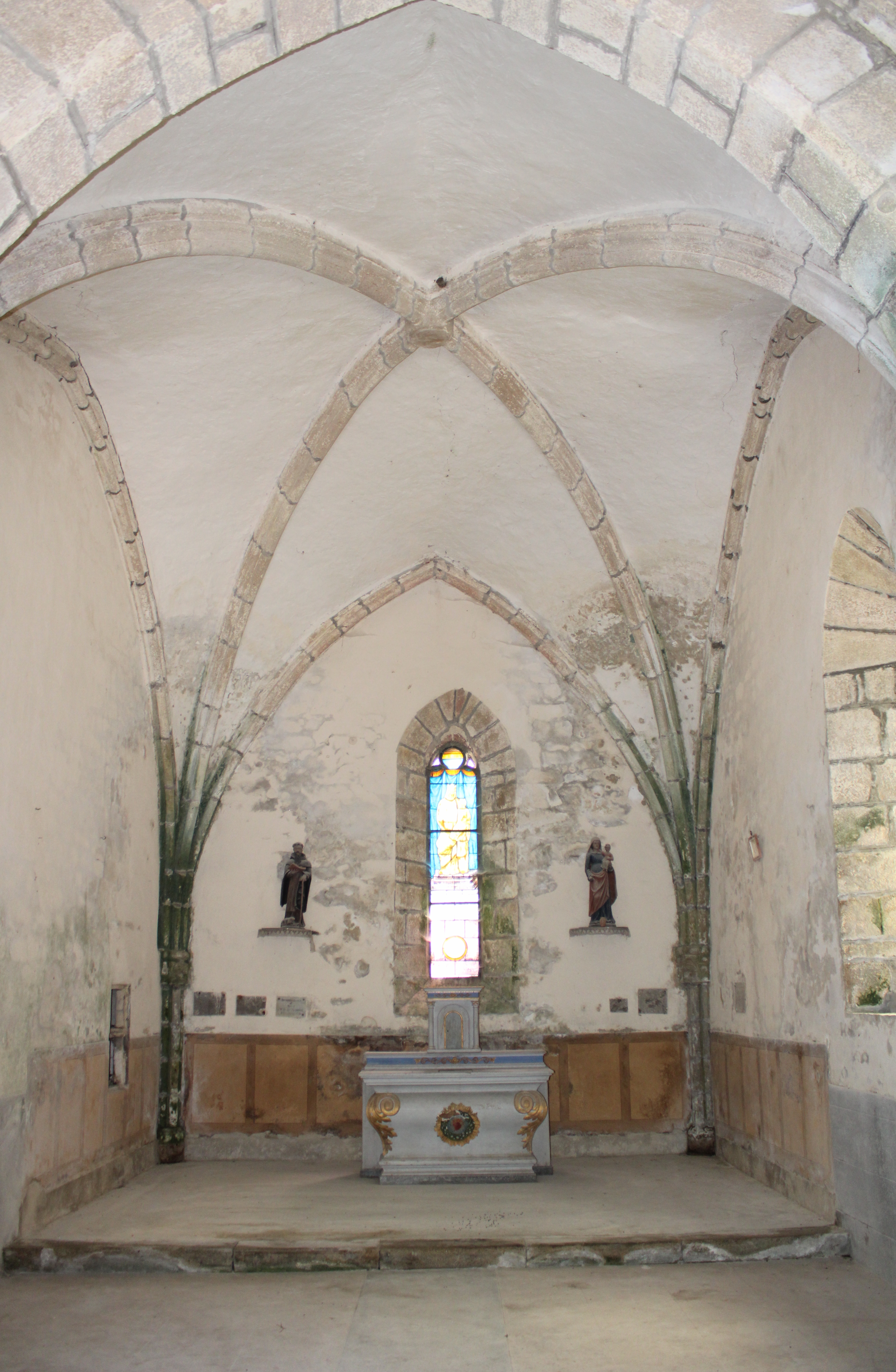
The choir.
Monuments de Saint-Merd-les-Oussines

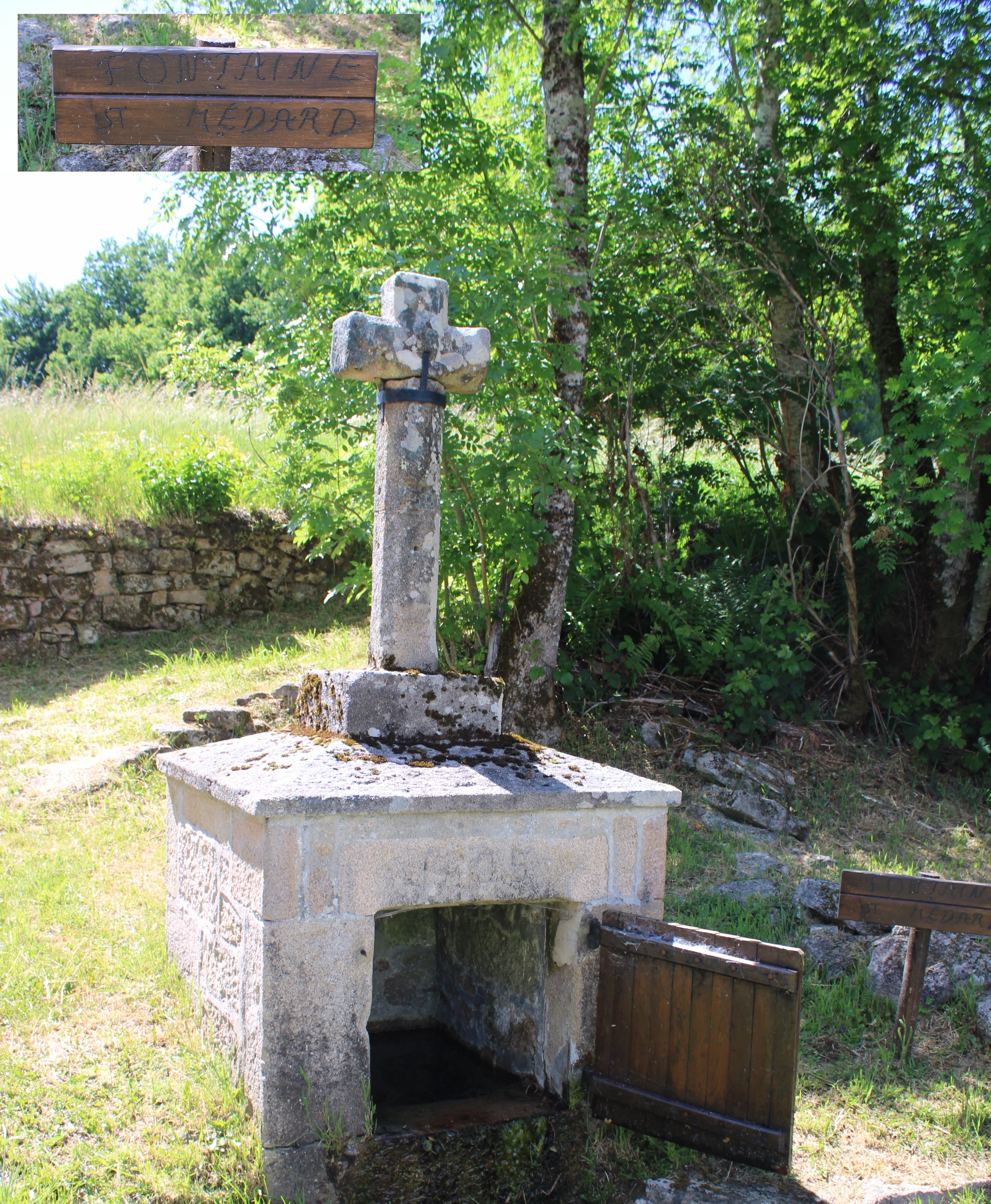
The Saint-Médard fountain.

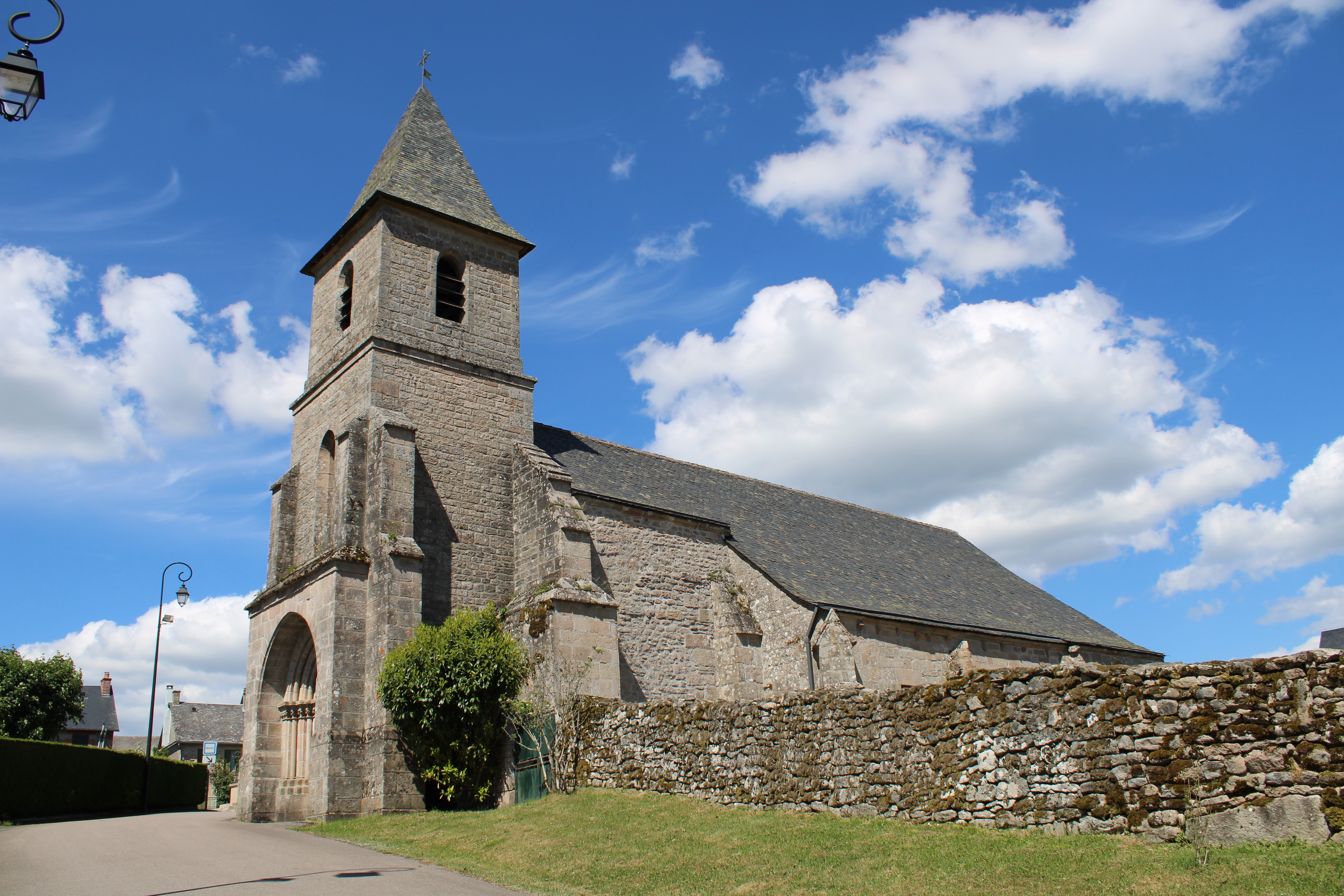
The church of Saint-Médard.

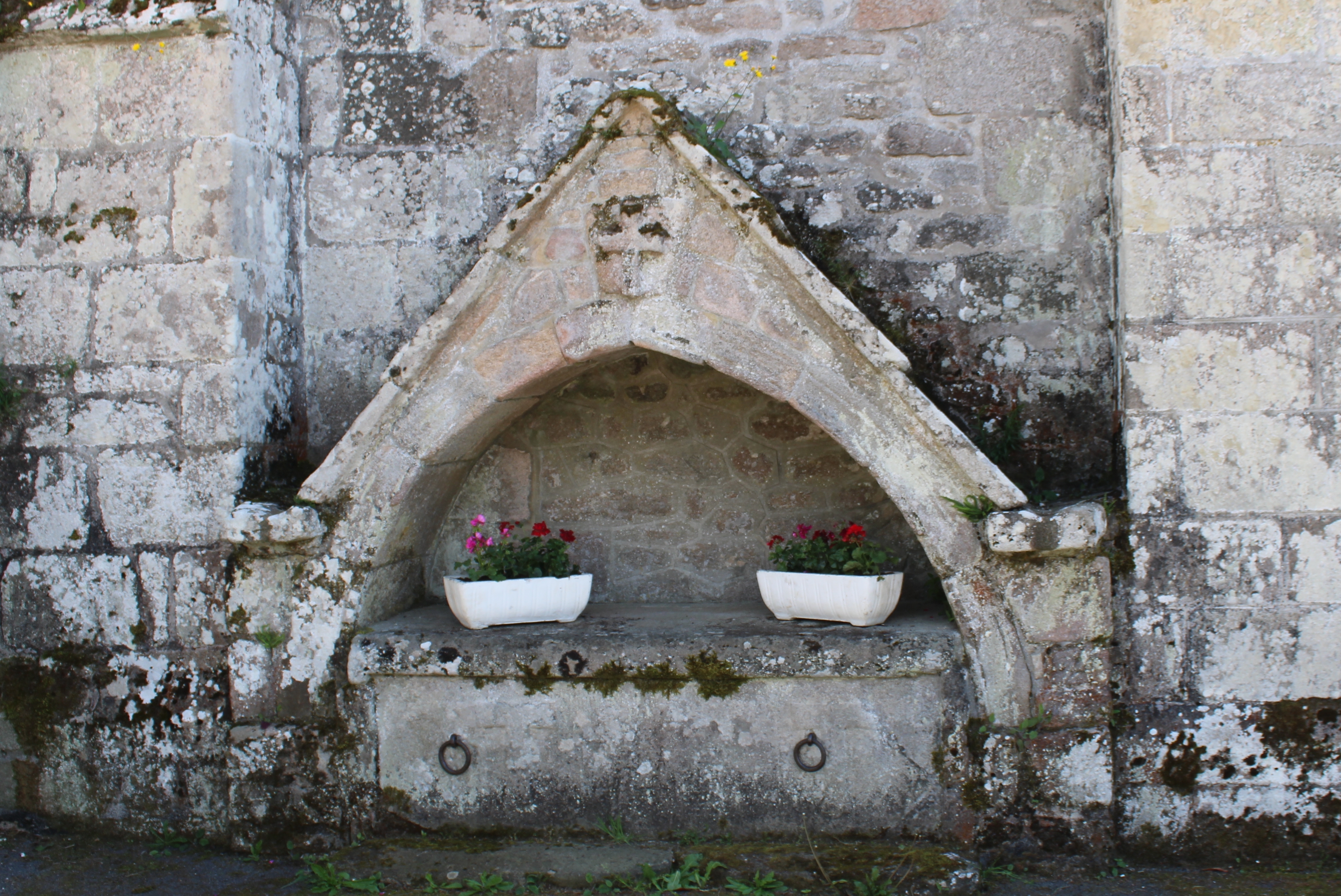
Exterior of the church.

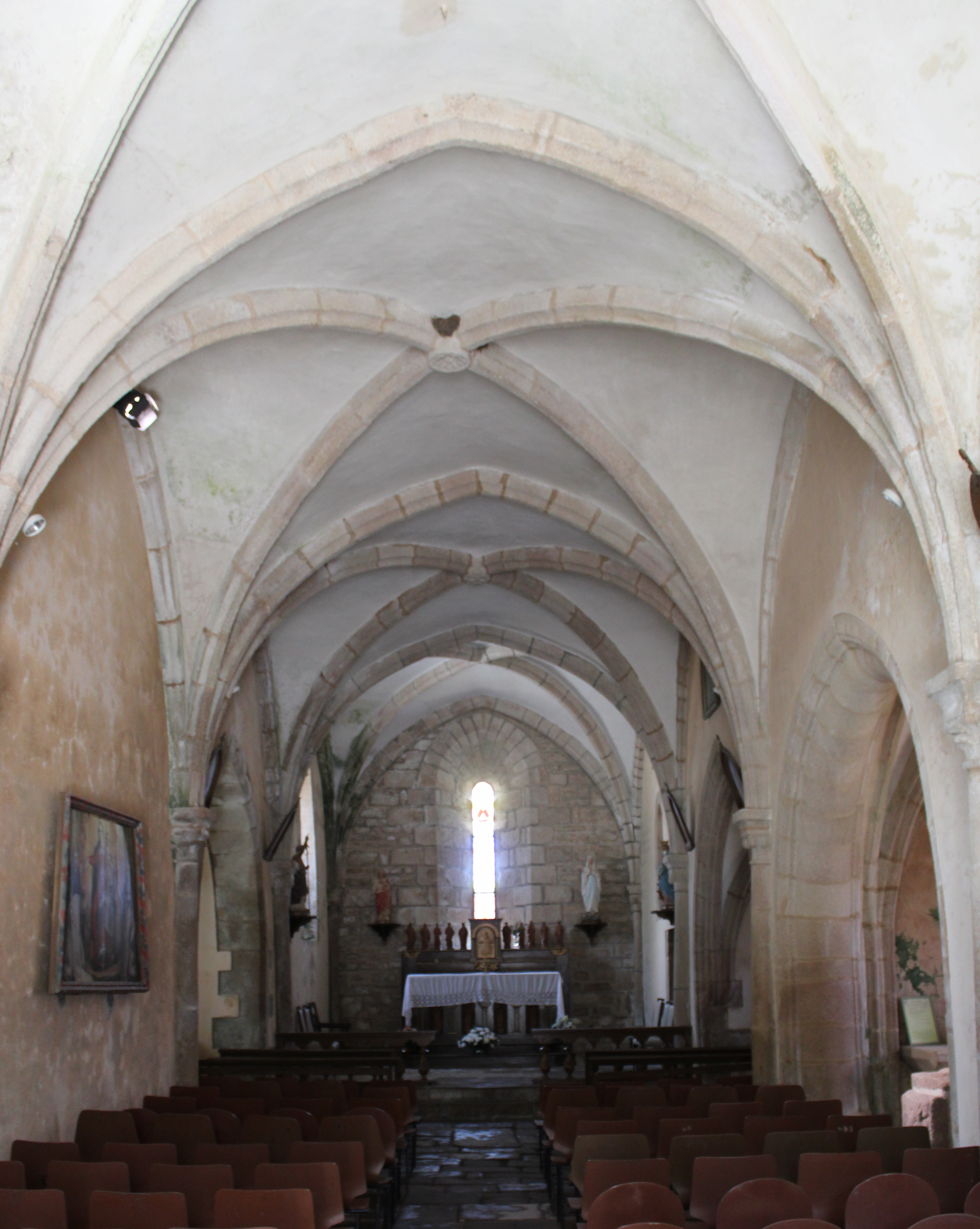
The nave of the church.

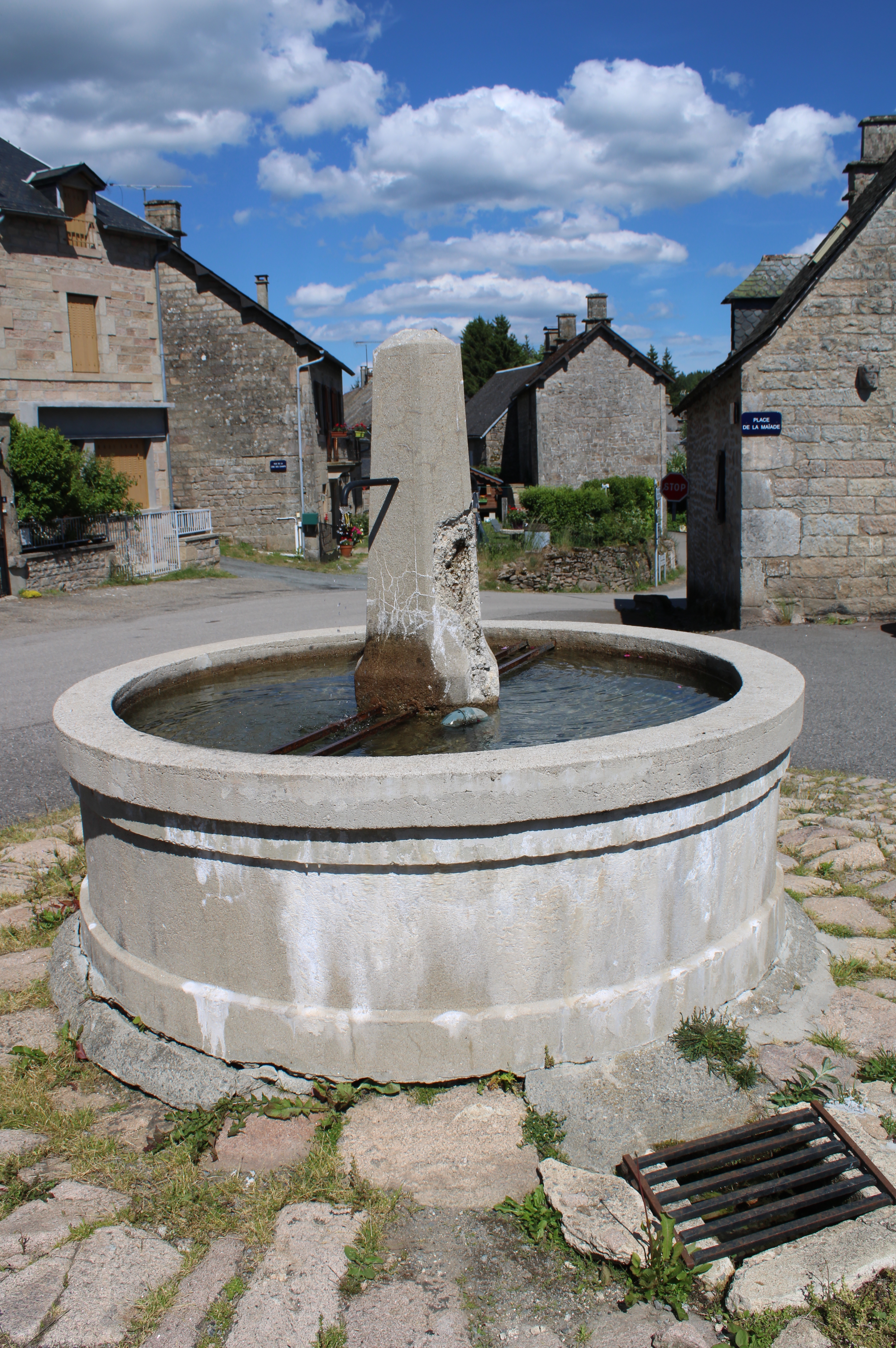
The fountain of the town hall.

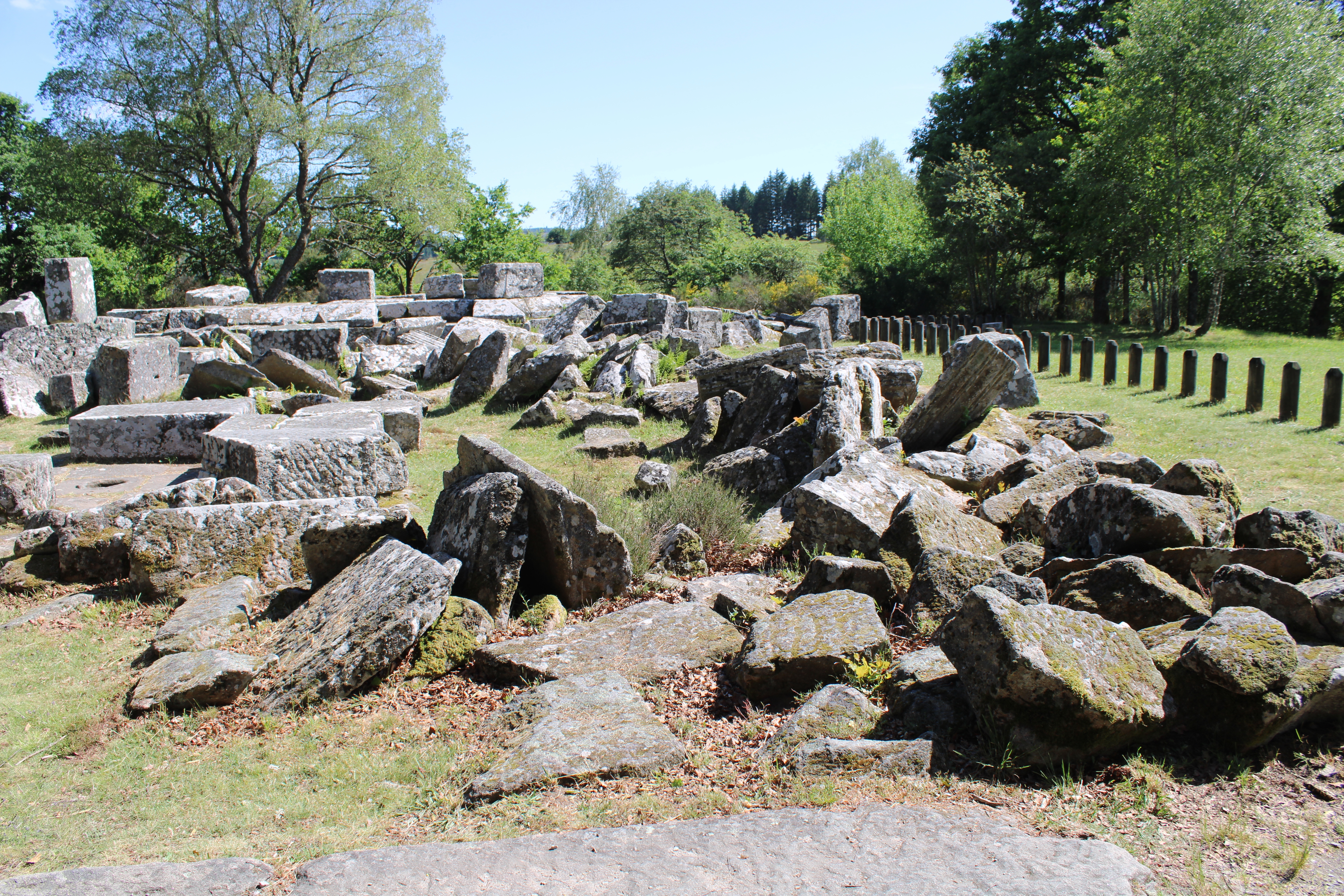
Site gallo-romain Des Cars.

== See also ==
- Communes of the Corrèze department
