= Arrondissement of Ussel =

Coordinates: 45.55°N 2.32°E

Ussel
- Arrondissement
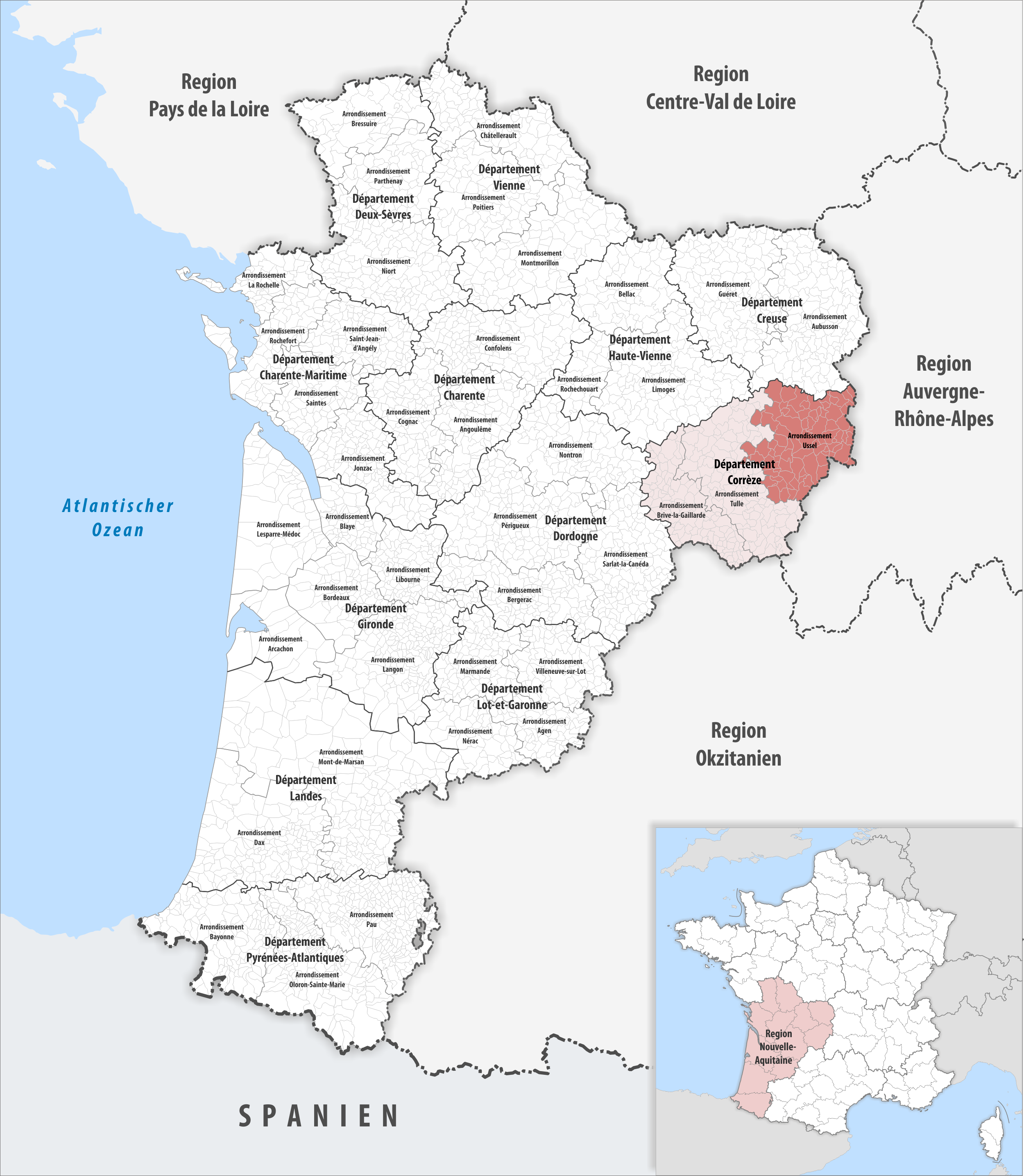
- Location within the region Nouvelle-Aquitaine
- Country: France
- Region: Nouvelle-Aquitaine
- Department: Corrèze
- No. of communes: {{{nbcomm}}}
- Area: 1,990.9 km^{2} (768.7 sq mi)
- Population (2023): 40,279
  - Density: 20.232/km^{2} (52.399/sq mi)
- INSEE code: 193

The arrondissement of Ussel is an arrondissement of France in the Corrèze department in the Nouvelle-Aquitaine region. It has 78 communes. Its population is 40,136 (2021), and its area is 1,990.9 km^{2} (768.7 sq mi).

== Composition ==
The communes of the arrondissement of Ussel, and their INSEE codes, are:

1. Aix (19002)
2. Alleyrat (19006)
3. Ambrugeat (19008)
4. Bellechassagne (19021)
5. Bort-les-Orgues (19028)
6. Champagnac-la-Noaille (19039)
7. Chapelle-Spinasse (19046)
8. Chaumeil (19051)
9. Chavanac (19052)
10. Chaveroche (19053)
11. Chirac-Bellevue (19055)
12. Combressol (19058)
13. Confolent-Port-Dieu (19167)
14. Couffy-sur-Sarsonne (19064)
15. Courteix (19065)
16. Darnets (19070)
17. Davignac (19071)
18. Égletons (19073)
19. Eygurande (19080)
20. Feyt (19083)
21. Lafage-sur-Sombre (19097)
22. Lamazière-Basse (19102)
23. Lamazière-Haute (19103)
24. Lapleau (19106)
25. Laroche-près-Feyt (19108)
26. Latronche (19110)
27. Laval-sur-Luzège (19111)
28. Liginiac (19113)
29. Lignareix (19114)
30. Marcillac-la-Croisille (19125)
31. Margerides (19128)
32. Maussac (19130)
33. Merlines (19134)
34. Mestes (19135)
35. Meymac (19136)
36. Meyrignac-l'Église (19137)
37. Millevaches (19139)
38. Monestier-Merlines (19141)
39. Monestier-Port-Dieu (19142)
40. Montaignac-sur-Doustre (19143)
41. Moustier-Ventadour (19145)
42. Neuvic (19148)
43. Palisse (19157)
44. Péret-Bel-Air (19159)
45. Pérols-sur-Vézère (19160)
46. Peyrelevade (19164)
47. Roche-le-Peyroux (19175)
48. Rosiers-d'Égletons (19176)
49. Saint-Angel (19180)
50. Saint-Bonnet-près-Bort (19190)
51. Sainte-Marie-Lapanouze (19219)
52. Saint-Étienne-aux-Clos (19199)
53. Saint-Étienne-la-Geneste (19200)
54. Saint-Exupéry-les-Roches (19201)
55. Saint-Fréjoux (19204)
56. Saint-Germain-Lavolps (19206)
57. Saint-Hilaire-Foissac (19208)
58. Saint-Hilaire-Luc (19210)
59. Saint-Merd-de-Lapleau (19225)
60. Saint-Merd-les-Oussines (19226)
61. Saint-Pantaléon-de-Lapleau (19228)
62. Saint-Pardoux-le-Neuf (19232)
63. Saint-Pardoux-le-Vieux (19233)
64. Saint-Rémy (19238)
65. Saint-Setiers (19241)
66. Saint-Sulpice-les-Bois (19244)
67. Saint-Victour (19247)
68. Saint-Yrieix-le-Déjalat (19249)
69. Sarran (19251)
70. Sarroux-Saint Julien (19252)
71. Sérandon (19256)
72. Sornac (19261)
73. Soudeilles (19263)
74. Soursac (19264)
75. Thalamy (19266)
76. Ussel (19275)
77. Valiergues (19277)
78. Veyrières (19283)

== History ==
The arrondissement of Ussel was created in 1800, disbanded in 1926 and restored in 1943. At the January 2017 reorganisation of the arrondissements of Corrèze, it gained 19 communes from the arrondissement of Tulle, and it lost eight communes to the arrondissement of Tulle. In January 2024 the commune of Bugeat passed from the arrondissement of Ussel to the arrondissement of Tulle.

As a result of the reorganisation of the cantons of France which came into effect in 2015, the borders of the cantons are no longer related to the borders of the arrondissements. The cantons of the arrondissement of Ussel were, as of January 2015:

1. Bort-les-Orgues
2. Bugeat
3. Eygurande
4. Meymac
5. Neuvic
6. Sornac
7. Ussel-Est
8. Ussel-Ouest

== Sub-prefects ==
- Paul Masseron : 1977-1981
