= Monestier-Port-Dieu =

- Commune
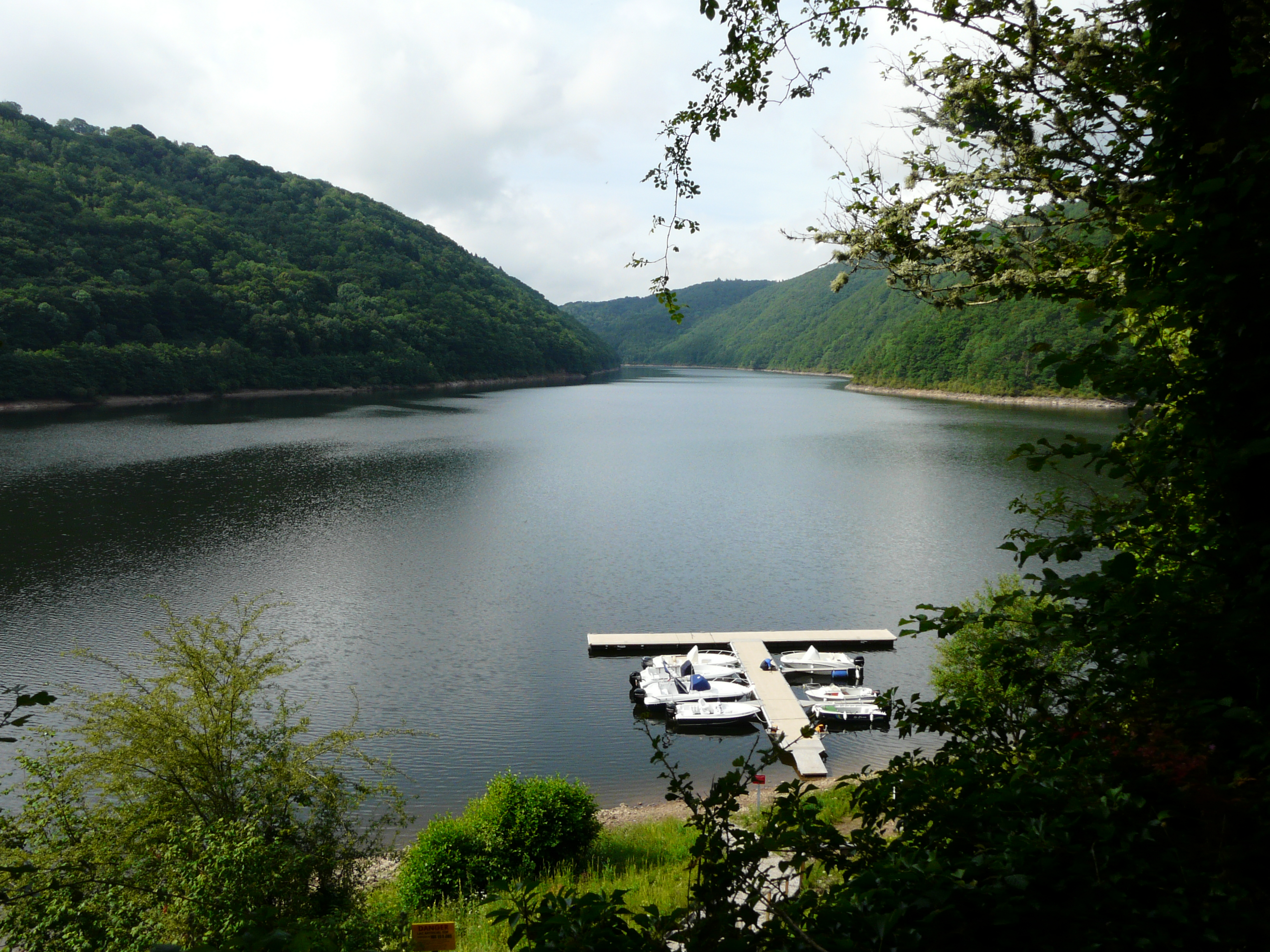
- Lake Bort-les-Orgues Lake, with Monestier-Port-Dieu in the background right

- Coat of arms
- Location of Monestier-Port-Dieu
- Location within France Location within Nouvelle-Aquitaine
- Coordinates: 45°29′38″N 2°30′08″E
- Country: France
- Region: Nouvelle-Aquitaine
- Department: Corrèze
- Arrondissement: Ussel
- Canton: Haute-Dordogne
- Intercommunality: Haute-Corrèze Communauté

Government
  - Mayor (2020–2026): Samuel Mouty
- Area^{1}: 18 km^{2} (6.9 sq mi)
- Highest elevation: 783 m (2,569 ft)
- Lowest elevation: 523 m (1,716 ft)
- Population (2023): 132
  - Density: 7.3/km^{2} (19/sq mi)
- Time zone: UTC+01:00 (CET)
  - Summer (DST): UTC+02:00 (CEST)
- INSEE/Postal code: 19142 /19110
- ^{1} French Land Register data, which excludes lakes, ponds, glaciers > 1 km^{2} (0.386 sq mi or 247 acres) and river estuaries.

Monestier-Port-Dieu (French pronunciation: [mɔnɛstje pɔʁ djø]; Occitan: Monestièr e Port Dieu) is a commune in the Corrèze department in central France.

== Population ==
Historical population
Year	Pop.	±% p.a.
1968	203	—
1975	155	−3.78%
1982	153	−0.19%
1990	143	−0.84%
1999	116	−2.30%
2007	124	+0.84%
2012	130	+0.95%
2017	103	−4.55%
2023	132	+4.22%
Source: INSEE

== See also ==
- Communes of the Corrèze department
