= Peyrelevade =

- Commune
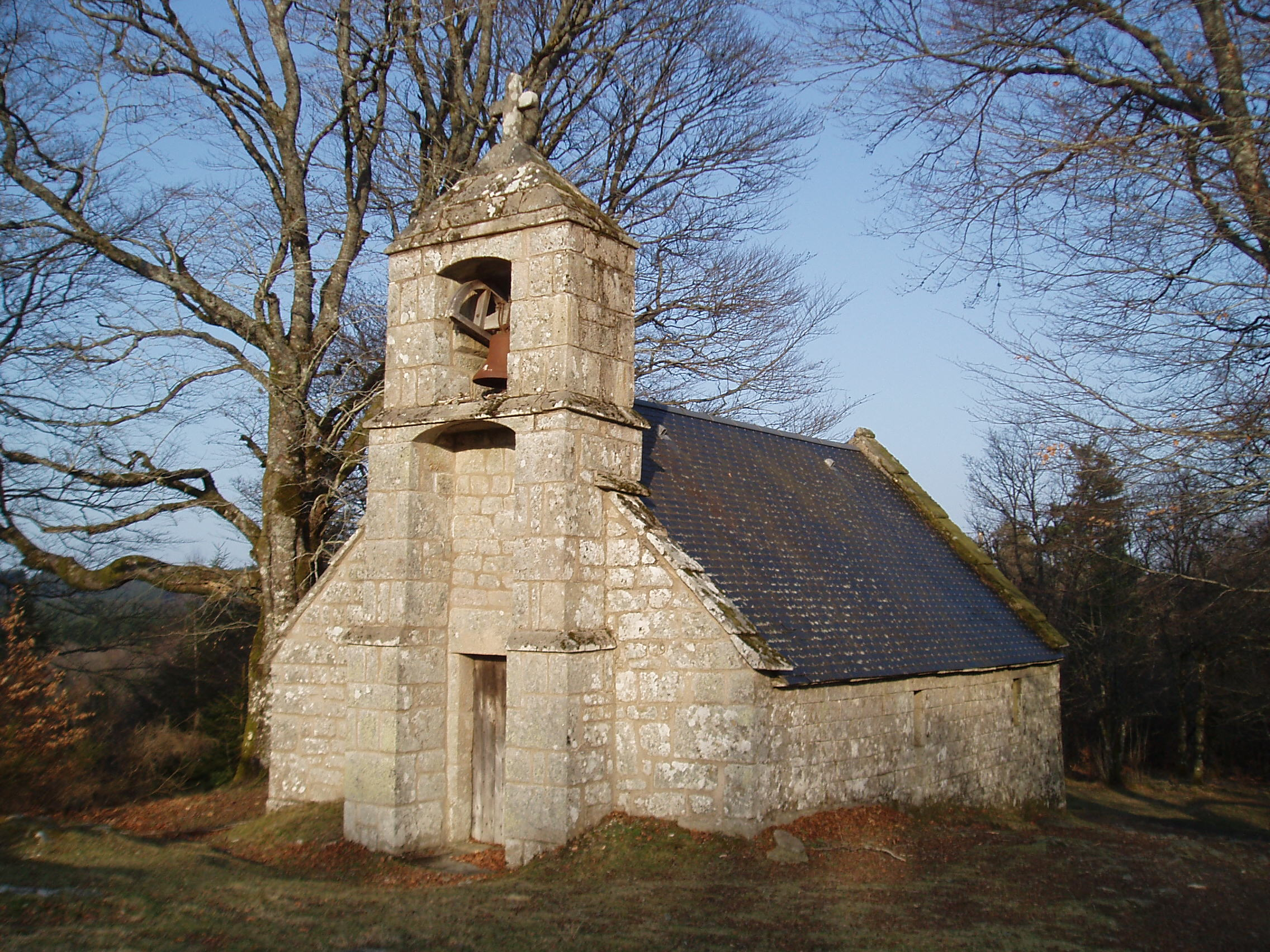
- The Chapel of Le Rat
- Location of Peyrelevade
- Location within France Location within Nouvelle-Aquitaine
- Coordinates: 45°42′18″N 2°03′18″E
- Country: France
- Region: Nouvelle-Aquitaine
- Department: Corrèze
- Arrondissement: Ussel
- Canton: Plateau de Millevaches
- Intercommunality: Haute-Corrèze Communauté

Government
  - Mayor (2020–2026): Pierre Coutaud
- Area^{1}: 66.43 km^{2} (25.65 sq mi)
- Elevation: 804 m (2,638 ft)
- Highest elevation: 951 m (3,120 ft)
- Lowest elevation: 674 m (2,211 ft)
- Population (2023): 824
  - Density: 12.4/km^{2} (32.1/sq mi)
- Time zone: UTC+01:00 (CET)
  - Summer (DST): UTC+02:00 (CEST)
- INSEE/Postal code: 19164 /19290
- ^{1} French Land Register data, which excludes lakes, ponds, glaciers > 1 km^{2} (0.386 sq mi or 247 acres) and river estuaries.

Peyrelevade (French pronunciation: [pɛʁləvad]; Occitan: Peiralevada) is a commune in the Corrèze department in central France.

== Demographics ==
Historical population
| Year | Pop. | ±% p.a. |
|---|---|---|
| 1968 | 1,181 | — |
| 1975 | 1,418 | +2.65% |
| 1982 | 1,119 | −3.33% |
| 1990 | 1,012 | −1.25% |
| 1999 | 830 | −2.18% |
| 2007 | 831 | +0.02% |
| 2012 | 809 | −0.54% |
| 2017 | 850 | +0.99% |
| 2023 | 824 | −0.52% |
Source: INSEE

== See also ==
- Communes of the Corrèze department
