= Lignareix =

- Commune
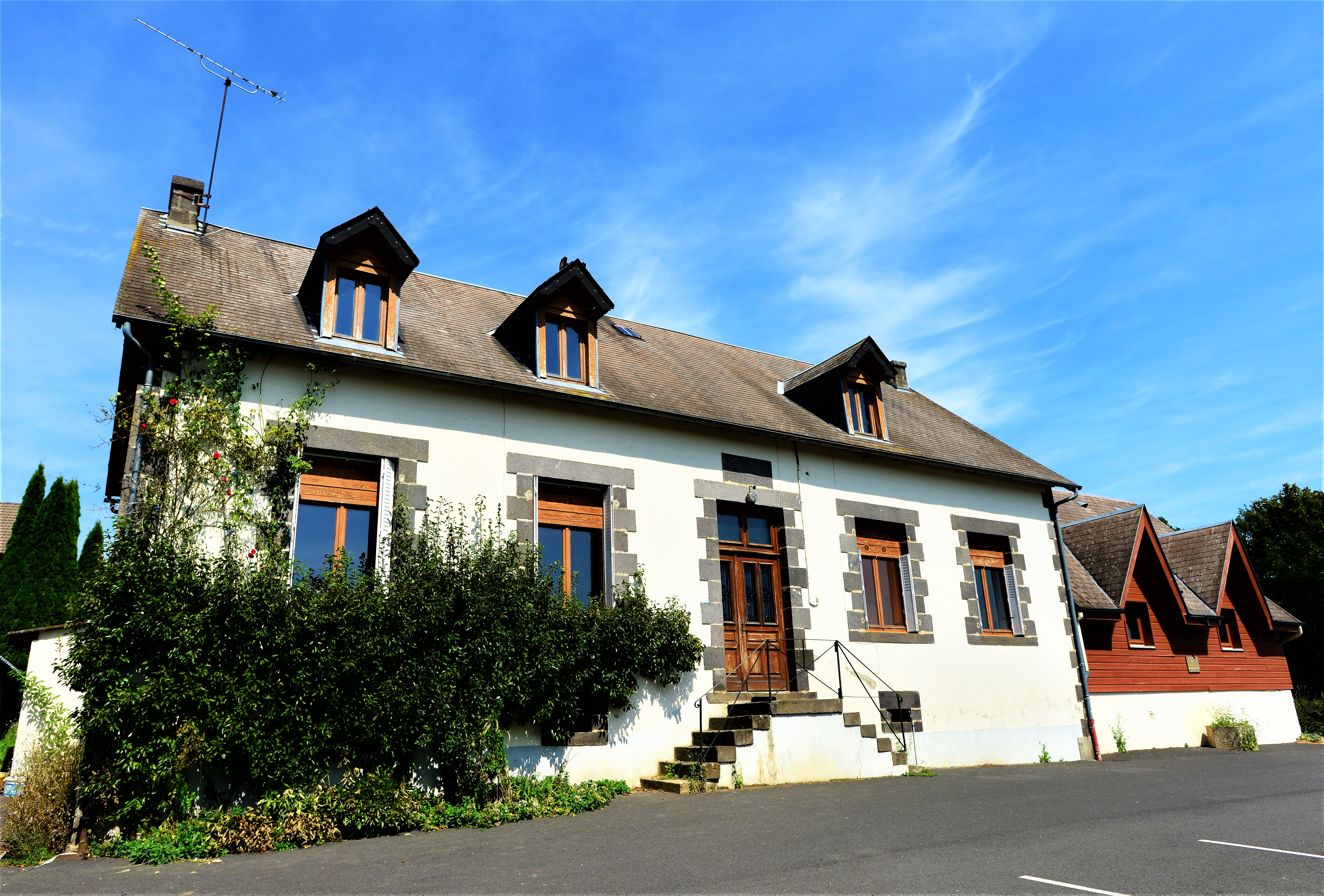
- Town hall

- Coat of arms
- Location of Lignareix
- Location within France Location within Nouvelle-Aquitaine
- Coordinates: 45°36′52″N 2°17′51″E
- Country: France
- Region: Nouvelle-Aquitaine
- Department: Corrèze
- Arrondissement: Ussel
- Canton: Plateau de Millevaches
- Intercommunality: Haute-Corrèze Communauté

Government
  - Mayor (2026–2032): Aline Chevalier
- Area^{1}: 9.38 km^{2} (3.62 sq mi)
- Highest elevation: 761 m (2,497 ft)
- Lowest elevation: 648 m (2,126 ft)
- Population (2023): 162
  - Density: 17.3/km^{2} (44.7/sq mi)
- Demonym(s): Lignareixois, Lignareixoises
- Time zone: UTC+01:00 (CET)
  - Summer (DST): UTC+02:00 (CEST)
- INSEE/Postal code: 19114 /19200
- ^{1} French Land Register data, which excludes lakes, ponds, glaciers > 1 km^{2} (0.386 sq mi or 247 acres) and river estuaries.

Lignareix (French pronunciation: [liɲaʁɛ]; Occitan: Linhares) is a commune in the Corrèze department in central France.

== History ==
The village's church was destroyed in the French Revolution and was never rebuilt.

== Population ==
Historical population
Year	Pop.	±% p.a.
1968	113	—
1975	83	−4.31%
1982	97	+2.25%
1990	169	+7.19%
1999	142	−1.92%
2007	156	+1.18%
2012	158	+0.26%
2017	164	+0.75%
2023	162	−0.20%
Source: INSEE

== Places and monuments ==
- Bifacial granite cross at the place called Linarzeix - erected in memory of the old church.
- l'Étang des Combeaux - originally constructed in 1811 and the raised in 1870, now home to fishing competitions.
- Forêt de Mirambel - numerous walks through the ancient forest with large oak and beech trees, and peat bogs.

== See also ==
- Communes of the Corrèze department
