= Saint-Rémy, Corrèze =

Saint-Rémy
- Commune
- Coat of arms
- Location of Saint-Rémy
- Location within France Location within Nouvelle-Aquitaine
- Coordinates: 45°39′24″N 2°16′21″E
- Country: France
- Region: Nouvelle-Aquitaine
- Department: Corrèze
- Arrondissement: Ussel
- Canton: Plateau de Millevaches
- Intercommunality: Haute-Corrèze Communauté

Government
  - Mayor (2020–2026): Michelle Chaumont
- Area^{1}: 30.96 km^{2} (11.95 sq mi)
- Elevation: 700 m (2,300 ft)
- Highest elevation: 828 m (2,717 ft)
- Lowest elevation: 670 m (2,200 ft)
- Population (2023): 244
  - Density: 7.88/km^{2} (20.4/sq mi)
- Time zone: UTC+01:00 (CET)
  - Summer (DST): UTC+02:00 (CEST)
- INSEE/Postal code: 19238 /19290
- ^{1} French Land Register data, which excludes lakes, ponds, glaciers > 1 km^{2} (0.386 sq mi or 247 acres) and river estuaries.

Saint-Rémy (French pronunciation: [sɛ̃ ʁemi]; Auvergnat: Sent Remic) is a commune in the Corrèze department in central France.

== Population ==
Historical population
Year	Pop.	±% p.a.
1968	302	—
1975	244	−3.00%
1982	232	−0.72%
1990	221	−0.61%
1999	228	+0.35%
2007	236	+0.43%
2012	221	−1.30%
2017	227	+0.54%
2023	244	+1.21%
Source: INSEE

== See also ==
- Communes of the Corrèze department
