= Péret-Bel-Air =

Péret-Bel-Air Peret (Occitan)
- Commune
- Coat of arms
- Location of Péret-Bel-Air
- Location within France Location within Nouvelle-Aquitaine
- Coordinates: 45°28′42″N 2°02′29″E
- Country: France
- Region: Nouvelle-Aquitaine
- Department: Corrèze
- Arrondissement: Ussel
- Canton: Plateau de Millevaches

Government
  - Mayor (2020–2026): Nadine Courteix
- Area^{1}: 15.49 km^{2} (5.98 sq mi)
- Highest elevation: 938 m (3,077 ft)
- Lowest elevation: 617 m (2,024 ft)
- Population (2023): 84
  - Density: 5.4/km^{2} (14/sq mi)
- Time zone: UTC+01:00 (CET)
  - Summer (DST): UTC+02:00 (CEST)
- INSEE/Postal code: 19159 /19300
- ^{1} French Land Register data, which excludes lakes, ponds, glaciers > 1 km^{2} (0.386 sq mi or 247 acres) and river estuaries.

Péret-Bel-Air (French: [peʁɛ bɛl ɛːʁ]; Occitan: Peret Bèl Air) is a commune in the Corrèze department in central France.

== Population ==
Historical population
Year	Pop.	±% p.a.
1968	121	—
1975	108	−1.61%
1982	84	−3.53%
1990	76	−1.24%
1999	87	+1.51%
2007	100	+1.76%
2012	102	+0.40%
2017	91	−2.26%
2023	84	−1.33%
Source: INSEE

== See also ==
- Communes of the Corrèze department
