= Toy-Viam =

- Commune
- Coat of arms
- Location of Toy-Viam
- Location within France Location within Nouvelle-Aquitaine
- Coordinates: 45°38′57″N 1°55′59″E
- Country: France
- Region: Nouvelle-Aquitaine
- Department: Corrèze
- Arrondissement: Tulle
- Canton: Plateau de Millevaches

Government
  - Mayor (2026–32): Fabienne Gustin
- Area^{1}: 9.93 km^{2} (3.83 sq mi)
- Highest elevation: 857 m (2,812 ft)
- Lowest elevation: 609 m (1,998 ft)
- Population (2023): 35
  - Density: 3.5/km^{2} (9.1/sq mi)
- Time zone: UTC+01:00 (CET)
  - Summer (DST): UTC+02:00 (CEST)
- INSEE/Postal code: 19268 /19170
- ^{1} French Land Register data, which excludes lakes, ponds, glaciers > 1 km^{2} (0.386 sq mi or 247 acres) and river estuaries.

Toy-Viam (French pronunciation: [twa vjɑ̃]; Occitan: Autoire Viam) is a commune in the Corrèze department in central France.

== History ==
Around the year 1060, as the beneficiary of a donation by the Viscount of Aubusson, the Abbey of Tulle built a church on the site to make it the center of a new parish.

Around 1088, Viscount Ramnulf of Aubusson confirmed the donation made by his father of the church of Altoire and its dependencies. That same year, at the request of the monks of Tulle Abbey, the Viscounts of Aubusson and the Counts of Marche agreed to "give their forest (sylva) known as Altoire with all the cultivated and uncultivated lands dependent upon it." By 1091, texts already mention the tithe of Altoire and no longer just that of Tarnac. Within about ten years, a parish was thus formed around the Church of Saint-Jacques d'Altoire, the boundaries of which defined a sort of enclave of 993 hectares (2,450 acres) on the border zone of the parishes of Viam and Tarnac. The boundaries of this parish of Altoire correspond today to the commune of Toy-Viam. In fact, the new village was the seat not only of a parish but also of a priory dependent on Tulle Abbey and held in 1106 by two monks, whose possession was, however, immediately and violently contested (1106–1107) by the Cluniac monks of the priory of Bort.

== Geography ==
Located in the foothills of the Massif Central on the Plateau de Millevaches in the heart of the highlands of the Limousin mountains, the Parc Naturel Régional de Millevaches en Limousin extends over the departments of Corrèze, Creuse and Haute-Vienne, between 400 and 1000 metres above sea level. The village itself is at an altitude of 700m.

== Population ==
Historical population
Year	Pop.	±% p.a.
1968	66	—
1975	69	+0.64%
1982	56	−2.94%
1990	56	+0.00%
1999	28	−7.41%
2007	31	+1.28%
2012	34	+1.86%
2017	37	+1.71%
2023	35	−0.92%
Source: INSEE

== Culture and heritage ==
=== Places and monuments ===
- Église Saint-Jacques-le-Majeur - It is listed in the General Inventory of Cultural Heritage. It was priory church from the 11th-century, then rebuilt during the 14th-century and has a bell gable. The door of the church has carved scenes from the bible. The left panel, shows scenes of the Old Testament, Abraham, Moses and the serpent, and the Arc of the Covenant and the right, shows scenes from the New Testament, Jesus and his crucifixion. It was a parish church from 1686.
Carved church door.

=== Personalities linked to the commune ===
- Richard Millet (born in Viam in 1953), has set several of his novels explicitly in Toy-Viam.
- Franck Bouysse, sets his novel Plateau in Toy-Viam (2016).

== See also ==
- Communes of the Corrèze department
