= Pradines, Corrèze =

Pradines
- Commune
- Coat of arms
- Location of Pradines
- Location within France Location within Nouvelle-Aquitaine
- Coordinates: 45°30′27″N 1°54′36″E
- Country: France
- Region: Nouvelle-Aquitaine
- Department: Corrèze
- Arrondissement: Tulle
- Canton: Plateau de Millevaches

Government
  - Mayor (2020–2026): André Laurent
- Area^{1}: 19.59 km^{2} (7.56 sq mi)
- Highest elevation: 907 m (2,976 ft)
- Lowest elevation: 599 m (1,965 ft)
- Population (2023): 92
  - Density: 4.7/km^{2} (12/sq mi)
- Time zone: UTC+01:00 (CET)
  - Summer (DST): UTC+02:00 (CEST)
- INSEE/Postal code: 19168 /19170
- ^{1} French Land Register data, which excludes lakes, ponds, glaciers > 1 km^{2} (0.386 sq mi or 247 acres) and river estuaries.

Pradines (French pronunciation: [pʁadin]; Occitan: Pradinas) is a commune in the Corrèze department in central France.

== Population ==
Historical population
Year	Pop.	±% p.a.
1968	182	—
1975	152	−2.54%
1982	141	−1.07%
1990	120	−2.00%
1999	95	−2.56%
2007	103	+1.02%
2012	105	+0.39%
2017	91	−2.82%
2023	92	+0.18%
Source: INSEE

== See also ==
- Communes of the Corrèze department
