= Saint-Angel, Corrèze =

Saint-Angel
- Commune
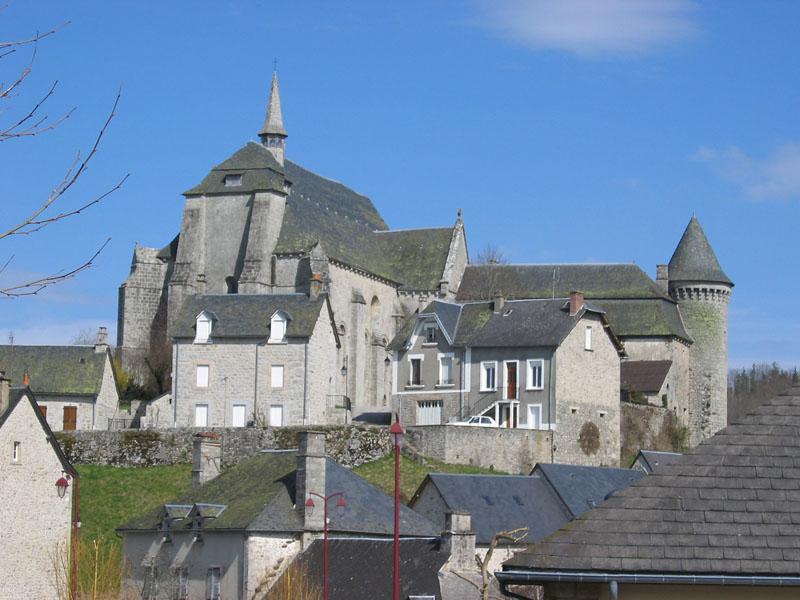
- The church and the abbey of Saint-Michel-des-Anges, in Saint-Angel

- Coat of arms
- Location of Saint-Angel
- Location within France Location within Nouvelle-Aquitaine
- Coordinates: 45°30′19″N 2°13′57″E
- Country: France
- Region: Nouvelle-Aquitaine
- Department: Corrèze
- Arrondissement: Ussel
- Canton: Plateau de Millevaches
- Intercommunality: Haute-Corrèze Communauté

Government
  - Mayor (2020–2026): Jacqueline Cornelissen
- Area^{1}: 47.54 km^{2} (18.36 sq mi)
- Elevation: 650 m (2,130 ft)
- Highest elevation: 773 m (2,536 ft)
- Lowest elevation: 610 m (2,000 ft)
- Population (2023): 702
  - Density: 14.8/km^{2} (38.2/sq mi)
- Time zone: UTC+01:00 (CET)
  - Summer (DST): UTC+02:00 (CEST)
- INSEE/Postal code: 19180 /19200
- ^{1} French Land Register data, which excludes lakes, ponds, glaciers > 1 km^{2} (0.386 sq mi or 247 acres) and river estuaries.

Saint-Angel (French pronunciation: [sɛ̃.t‿ɑ̃ʒɛl]; Occitan: Sent Angiau) is a commune in the Corrèze department in central France.

The inhabitants of Saint-Angel are Saint-Angélois.

== History ==
The village owes its name to the priory founded in the 8th-century by Roger, Viscount of Limoges and his wife Euphrasia and dedicated to Saint Michel-des-Anges. It was given to the Charroux Abbey. It was a place occupied by the English during the Hundred Years' War with the end of its occupation marked by the burning of the priory in 1375. More damaged occurred during the French Wars of Religion which was repaired by the Benedictine Congregation of Saint Maur in the mid-17th century.

In 1793, Saint-Fréjoux-le-Mineur merged with Saint-Angel. During the French Revolution, by a decree of the National Convention, its name was changed to Angel-la-Montagne.

The Jesser's brigade, an anti-resistance German army mechanised unit passed through the commune during the Second World War.

== Geography ==
A commune in the Massif Central located in the urban area of Ussel on the Plateau de Millevaches, it is crossed from west to east by the national road 89. The village is located on a rocky outcrop overlooking the right bank of the Triouzoune and flows south-southeast through the commune and forms part of its southeastern boundary.

The commune is situated in the Parc Naturel Régional de Millevaches en Limousin and is surrounded by numerous coniferous forests (Douglas fir and Scots pine).

== Population ==
Historical population
Year	Pop.	±% p.a.
1968	638	—
1975	512	−3.09%
1982	562	+1.34%
1990	566	+0.09%
1999	590	+0.46%
2007	675	+1.70%
2012	684	+0.27%
2017	709	+0.72%
2023	702	−0.17%
Source: INSEE

== Places and monuments ==
- Prieuré Saint-Michel-des-Anges - the priory dates from the 8th century, the Abbey church was built between 11th and 12th-centuries. The resembles a fortress with buttressed façade, with romanesque walls and a gothic style vaulted nave with side aisles that support the vaults. The windows in the side wall are of a Limousin-style of the romanesque period. The seven sided aspe is rib vaulted, with small chapels, and pointed arch windows. The chapter house and round tower were built between the 14th and 15th-centuries. The priory also had two square towers that were demolished. The building was classified as a historical monument in 1840.

== Notable people ==
- Jean-Baptiste Poulbrière (1842–1917), French religious and writer.

== See also ==
- Communes of the Corrèze department
