= Combressol =

- Commune
- Coat of arms
- Location of Combressol
- Location within France Location within Nouvelle-Aquitaine
- Coordinates: 45°28′34″N 2°09′39″E
- Country: France
- Region: Nouvelle-Aquitaine
- Department: Corrèze
- Arrondissement: Ussel
- Canton: Plateau de Millevaches
- Intercommunality: Haute-Corrèze Communauté

Government
  - Mayor (2026–32): Christine Rougerie
- Area^{1}: 25.43 km^{2} (9.82 sq mi)
- Highest elevation: 728 m (2,388 ft)
- Lowest elevation: 510 m (1,670 ft)
- Population (2023): 386
  - Density: 15.2/km^{2} (39.3/sq mi)
- Time zone: UTC+01:00 (CET)
  - Summer (DST): UTC+02:00 (CEST)
- INSEE/Postal code: 19058 /19250
- ^{1} French Land Register data, which excludes lakes, ponds, glaciers > 1 km^{2} (0.386 sq mi or 247 acres) and river estuaries.

Combressol (French pronunciation: [kɔ̃bʁəsɔl]; Occitan: Combrossòl) is a commune in the Corrèze department in central France.

== Geography ==
The Luzège forms the commune's western boundary.

== Population ==
Historical population
Year	Pop.	±% p.a.
1968	507	—
1975	382	−3.96%
1982	282	−4.24%
1990	270	−0.54%
1999	305	+1.36%
2007	354	+1.88%
2012	337	−0.98%
2017	346	+0.53%
2023	386	+1.84%
Source: INSEE

== See also ==
- Communes of the Corrèze department
