= Lestards =

- Commune
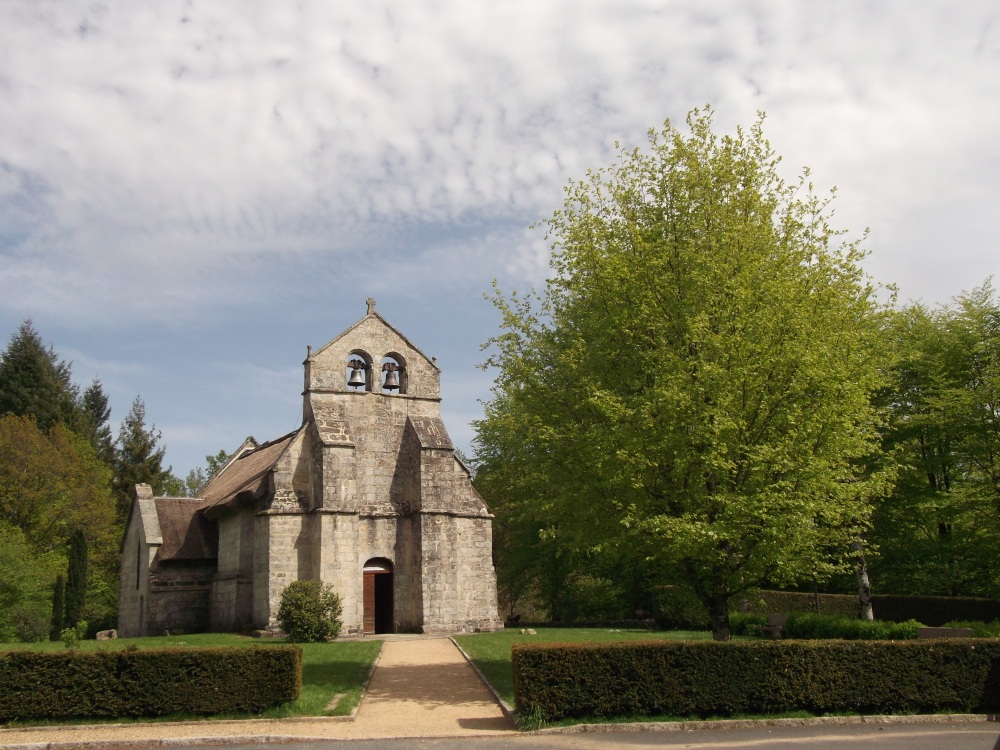
- The church of Saint-Martial, in Lestards

- Coat of arms
- Location of Lestards
- Location within France Location within Nouvelle-Aquitaine
- Coordinates: 45°30′59″N 1°52′29″E
- Country: France
- Region: Nouvelle-Aquitaine
- Department: Corrèze
- Arrondissement: Tulle
- Canton: Plateau de Millevaches

Government
  - Mayor (2020–2026): Christophe Petit
- Area^{1}: 18.52 km^{2} (7.15 sq mi)
- Highest elevation: 894 m (2,933 ft)
- Lowest elevation: 518 m (1,699 ft)
- Population (2023): 117
  - Density: 6.32/km^{2} (16.4/sq mi)
- Time zone: UTC+01:00 (CET)
  - Summer (DST): UTC+02:00 (CEST)
- INSEE/Postal code: 19112 /19170
- ^{1} French Land Register data, which excludes lakes, ponds, glaciers > 1 km^{2} (0.386 sq mi or 247 acres) and river estuaries.

Lestards (French pronunciation: [lɛstaʁ]; Occitan: Lestaurs) is a commune in the Corrèze department in central France.

== Population ==
Historical population
Year	Pop.	±% p.a.
1968	139	—
1975	116	−2.55%
1982	92	−3.26%
1990	106	+1.79%
1999	101	−0.54%
2007	110	+1.07%
2012	104	−1.12%
2017	106	+0.38%
2023	117	+1.66%
Source: INSEE

== See also ==
- Communes of the Corrèze department
