= Latronche =

- Commune
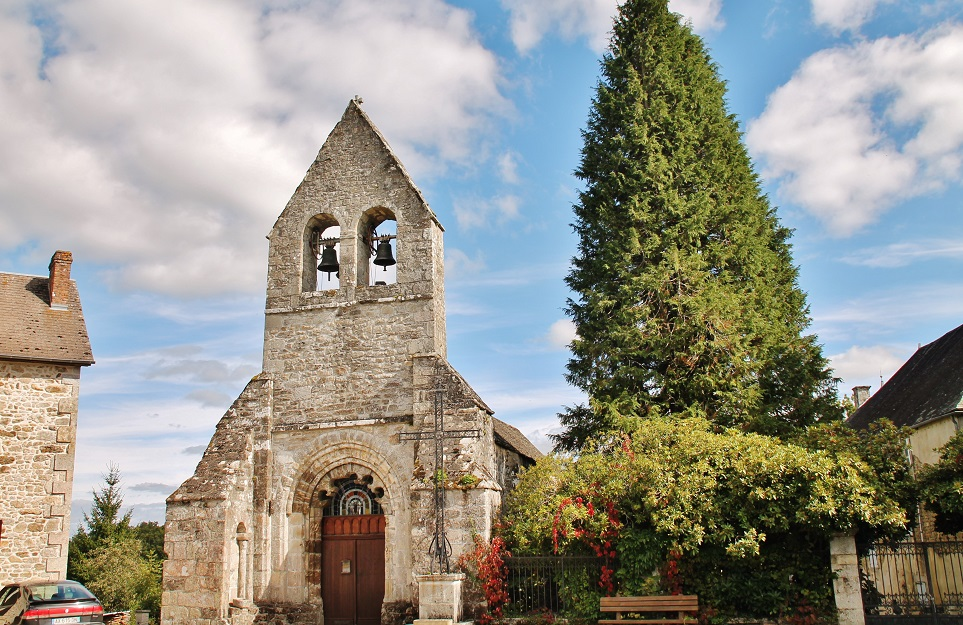
- St. Peter's Church of Latronche

- Coat of arms
- Location of Latronche
- Location within France Location within Nouvelle-Aquitaine
- Coordinates: 45°17′45″N 2°13′43″E
- Country: France
- Region: Nouvelle-Aquitaine
- Department: Corrèze
- Arrondissement: Ussel
- Canton: Haute-Dordogne
- Intercommunality: Haute-Corrèze Communauté

Government
  - Mayor (2020–2026): Marie Christine Soulefour
- Area^{1}: 19.79 km^{2} (7.64 sq mi)
- Elevation: 570 m (1,870 ft)
- Highest elevation: 606 m (1,988 ft)
- Lowest elevation: 321 m (1,053 ft)
- Population (2023): 112
  - Density: 5.66/km^{2} (14.7/sq mi)
- Time zone: UTC+01:00 (CET)
  - Summer (DST): UTC+02:00 (CEST)
- INSEE/Postal code: 19110 /19160
- ^{1} French Land Register data, which excludes lakes, ponds, glaciers > 1 km^{2} (0.386 sq mi or 247 acres) and river estuaries.

Latronche (French pronunciation: [latʁɔ̃ʃ]; Occitan: La Troncha) is a commune in the Corrèze department in central France.

== Population ==
Historical population
Year	Pop.	±% p.a.
1968	187	—
1975	167	−1.60%
1982	140	−2.49%
1990	123	−1.61%
1999	154	+2.53%
2007	134	−1.72%
2012	156	+3.09%
2017	134	−2.99%
2023	112	−2.94%
Source: INSEE

== See also ==
- Communes of the Corrèze department
