= Thalamy =

- Commune
- Coat of arms
- Location of Thalamy
- Location within France Location within Nouvelle-Aquitaine
- Coordinates: 45°30′51″N 2°27′37″E
- Country: France
- Region: Nouvelle-Aquitaine
- Department: Corrèze
- Arrondissement: Ussel
- Canton: Haute-Dordogne
- Intercommunality: Haute-Corrèze Communauté

Government
  - Mayor (2020–2026): Gérard Arnaud
- Area^{1}: 11.84 km^{2} (4.57 sq mi)
- Highest elevation: 768 m (2,520 ft)
- Lowest elevation: 632 m (2,073 ft)
- Population (2023): 107
  - Density: 9.04/km^{2} (23.4/sq mi)
- Time zone: UTC+01:00 (CET)
  - Summer (DST): UTC+02:00 (CEST)
- INSEE/Postal code: 19266 /19200
- ^{1} French Land Register data, which excludes lakes, ponds, glaciers > 1 km^{2} (0.386 sq mi or 247 acres) and river estuaries.

Thalamy (French pronunciation: [talami]; Occitan: Talamin) is a commune in the Corrèze department in central France.

== Population ==
Historical population
Year	Pop.	±% p.a.
1968	128	—
1975	117	−1.28%
1982	98	−2.50%
1990	92	−0.79%
1999	85	−0.88%
2007	85	+0.00%
2012	108	+4.91%
2017	97	−2.13%
2023	107	+1.65%
Source: INSEE

== See also ==
- Communes of the Corrèze department
