= Davignac =

- Commune
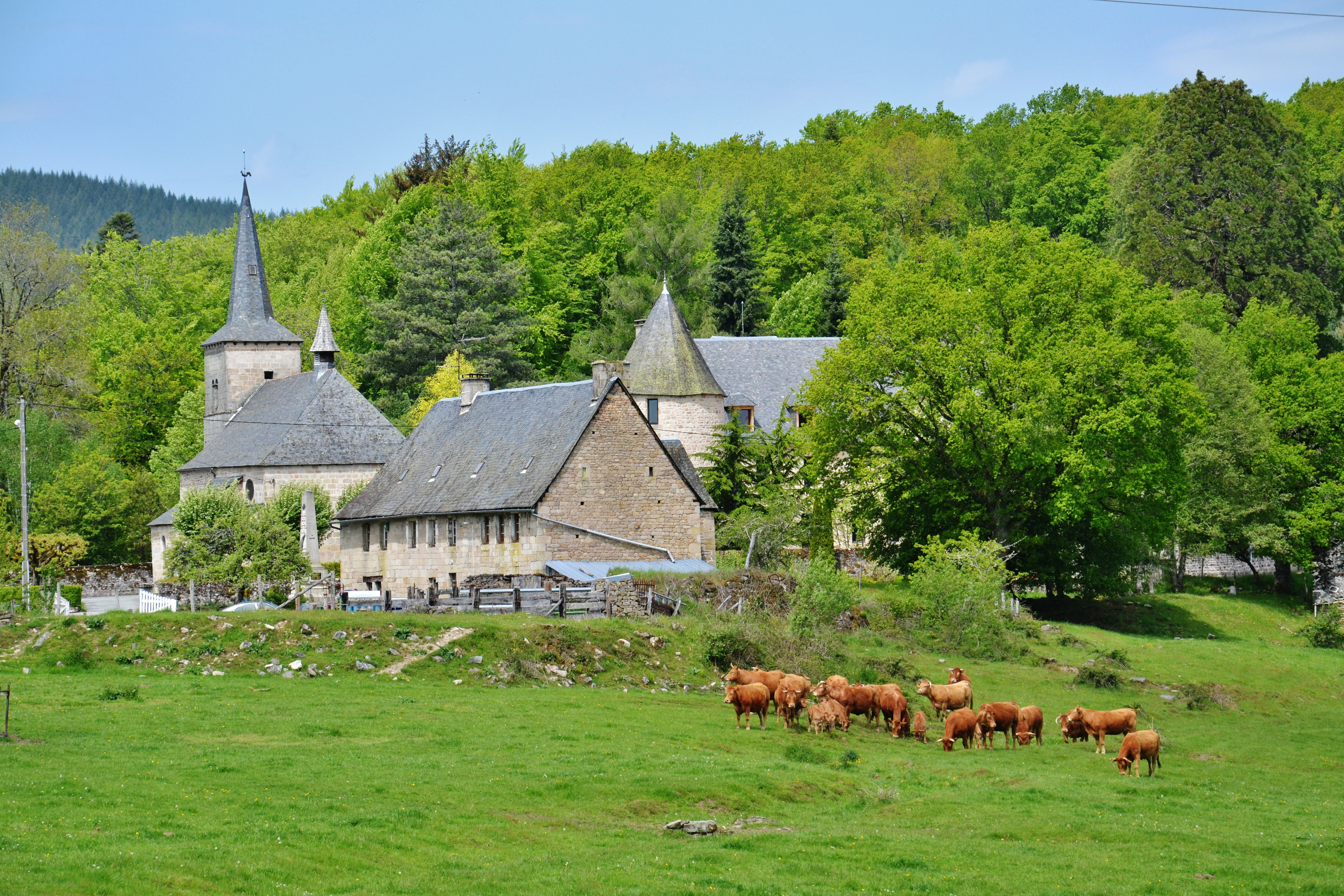
- A general view of Davignac

- Coat of arms
- Location of Davignac
- Location within France Location within Nouvelle-Aquitaine
- Coordinates: 45°29′09″N 2°05′40″E
- Country: France
- Region: Nouvelle-Aquitaine
- Department: Corrèze
- Arrondissement: Ussel
- Canton: Plateau de Millevaches
- Intercommunality: Haute-Corrèze Communauté

Government
  - Mayor (2026–32): Thomas Chaumeil
- Area^{1}: 30.14 km^{2} (11.64 sq mi)
- Highest elevation: 944 m (3,097 ft)
- Lowest elevation: 566 m (1,857 ft)
- Population (2023): 235
  - Density: 7.80/km^{2} (20.2/sq mi)
- Time zone: UTC+01:00 (CET)
  - Summer (DST): UTC+02:00 (CEST)
- INSEE/Postal code: 19071 /19250
- ^{1} French Land Register data, which excludes lakes, ponds, glaciers > 1 km^{2} (0.386 sq mi or 247 acres) and river estuaries.

Davignac (French pronunciation: [daviɲak]; Occitan: Davinhac) is a commune in the Corrèze department in central France.

== Population ==
Historical population
Year	Pop.	±% p.a.
1968	360	—
1975	307	−2.25%
1982	279	−1.36%
1990	289	+0.44%
1999	272	−0.67%
2007	254	−0.85%
2012	238	−1.29%
2017	208	−2.66%
2023	235	+2.05%
Source: INSEE

== See also ==
- Communes of the Corrèze department
