= Chavanac =

- Commune
- Coat of arms
- Location of Chavanac
- Location within France Location within Nouvelle-Aquitaine
- Coordinates: 45°37′32″N 2°05′41″E
- Country: France
- Region: Nouvelle-Aquitaine
- Department: Corrèze
- Arrondissement: Ussel
- Canton: Plateau de Millevaches
- Intercommunality: Haute-Corrèze Communauté

Government
  - Mayor (2020–2026): Stéphane Brindel
- Area^{1}: 9.85 km^{2} (3.80 sq mi)
- Highest elevation: 952 m (3,123 ft)
- Lowest elevation: 831 m (2,726 ft)
- Population (2023): 52
  - Density: 5.3/km^{2} (14/sq mi)
- Time zone: UTC+01:00 (CET)
  - Summer (DST): UTC+02:00 (CEST)
- INSEE/Postal code: 19052 /19290
- ^{1} French Land Register data, which excludes lakes, ponds, glaciers > 1 km^{2} (0.386 sq mi or 247 acres) and river estuaries.

Chavanac (French pronunciation: [ʃavanak]) is a commune in the Corrèze department in central France.

== Population ==
Historical population
Year	Pop.	±% p.a.
1968	67	—
1975	46	−5.23%
1982	48	+0.61%
1990	34	−4.22%
1999	49	+4.14%
2007	61	+2.78%
2012	54	−2.41%
2017	51	−1.14%
2023	52	+0.32%
Source: INSEE

== See also ==
- Communes of the Corrèze department
