= Gourdon-Murat =

- Commune
- Coat of arms
- Location of Gourdon-Murat
- Location within France Location within Nouvelle-Aquitaine
- Coordinates: 45°32′28″N 1°53′44″E
- Country: France
- Region: Nouvelle-Aquitaine
- Department: Corrèze
- Arrondissement: Tulle
- Canton: Plateau de Millevaches

Government
  - Mayor (2020–2026): Daniel Garais
- Area^{1}: 15.81 km^{2} (6.10 sq mi)
- Highest elevation: 859 m (2,818 ft)
- Lowest elevation: 675 m (2,215 ft)
- Population (2023): 83
  - Density: 5.2/km^{2} (14/sq mi)
- Time zone: UTC+01:00 (CET)
  - Summer (DST): UTC+02:00 (CEST)
- INSEE/Postal code: 19087 /19170
- ^{1} French Land Register data, which excludes lakes, ponds, glaciers > 1 km^{2} (0.386 sq mi or 247 acres) and river estuaries.

Gourdon-Murat (French pronunciation: [ɡuʁdɔ̃ myʁa]; Occitan: Gordon e Murat) is a commune in the Corrèze department in central France.

== Population ==
Historical population
Year	Pop.	±% p.a.
1968	174	—
1975	179	+0.41%
1982	150	−2.49%
1990	127	−2.06%
1999	108	−1.78%
2007	122	+1.54%
2012	108	−2.41%
2017	108	+0.00%
2023	83	−4.29%
Source: INSEE

== See also ==
- Communes of the Corrèze department
