= Alleyrat =

Alleyrat may refer to:

- Alleyrat, Corrèze, a commune of the Corrèze département in France
- Alleyrat, Creuse, a commune of the Creuse département in France
