= Neuvic, Corrèze =

Neuvic
- Commune
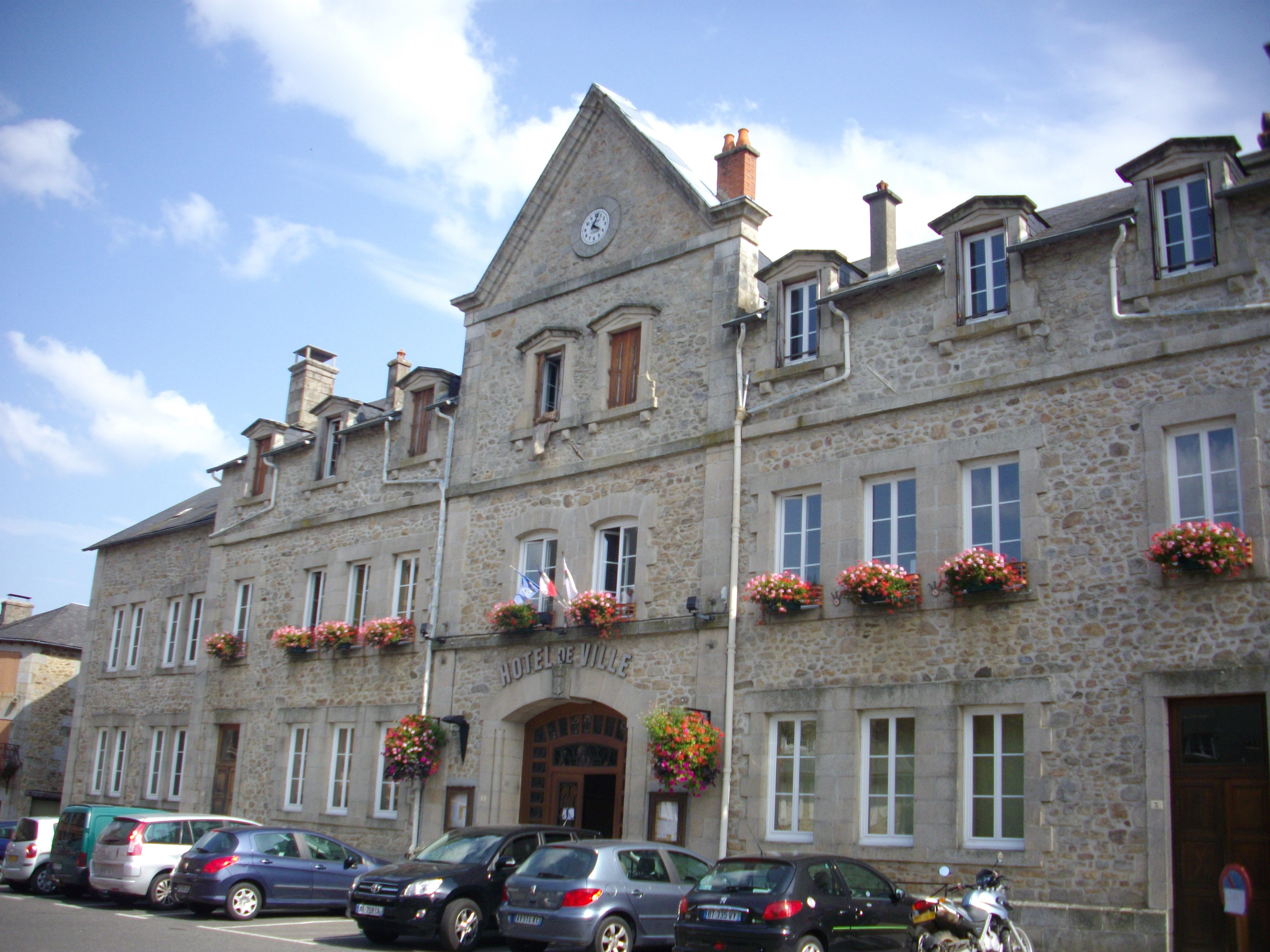
- Town hall

- Coat of arms
- Location of Neuvic
- Location within France Location within Nouvelle-Aquitaine
- Coordinates: 45°22′56″N 2°16′19″E
- Country: France
- Region: Nouvelle-Aquitaine
- Department: Corrèze
- Arrondissement: Ussel
- Canton: Haute-Dordogne
- Intercommunality: Haute-Corrèze Communauté

Government
  - Mayor (2020–2026): Dominique Miermont
- Area^{1}: 72.88 km^{2} (28.14 sq mi)
- Highest elevation: 698 m (2,290 ft)
- Lowest elevation: 321 m (1,053 ft)
- Population (2023): 1,567
  - Density: 21.50/km^{2} (55.69/sq mi)
- Time zone: UTC+01:00 (CET)
  - Summer (DST): UTC+02:00 (CEST)
- INSEE/Postal code: 19148 /19160
- ^{1} French Land Register data, which excludes lakes, ponds, glaciers > 1 km^{2} (0.386 sq mi or 247 acres) and river estuaries.

Neuvic (French pronunciation: [nøvik]; Occitan: Nòuvic) is a commune in the Corrèze department in central France.

== Geography ==
The Triouzoune forms the commune's eastern boundary, then flows into the Dordogne, which forms part of the commune's southern boundary.

== Population ==
Historical population
Year	Pop.	±% p.a.
1968	1,959	—
1975	1,848	−0.83%
1982	1,844	−0.03%
1990	1,829	−0.10%
1999	1,850	+0.13%
2007	1,887	+0.25%
2012	1,762	−1.36%
2017	1,648	−1.33%
2023	1,567	−0.84%
Source: INSEE

== See also ==
- Communes of the Corrèze department
