= Sérandon =

- Commune
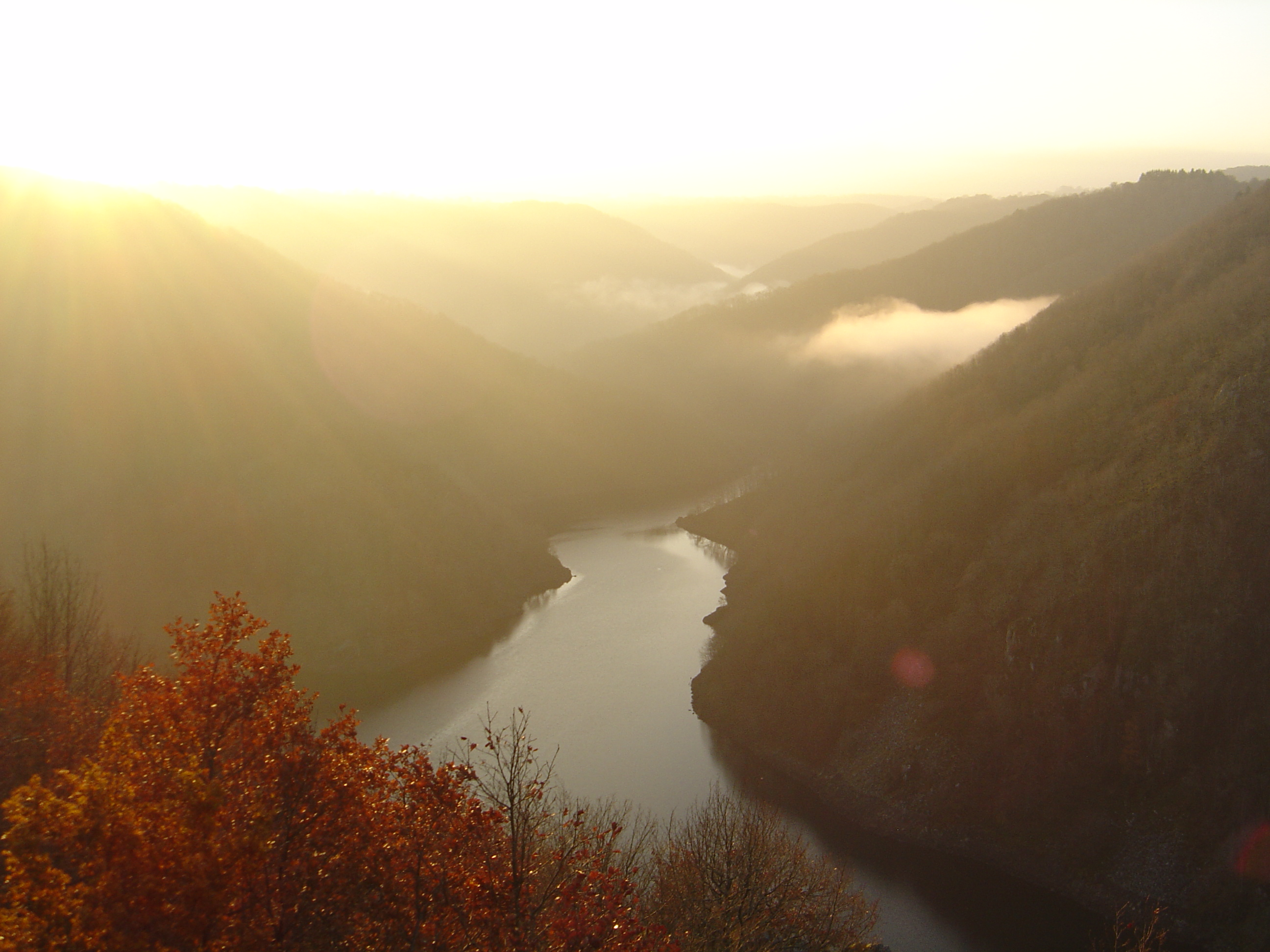
- The Dordogne from Gratte Bruyère viewpoint

- Coat of arms
- Location of Sérandon
- Location within France Location within Nouvelle-Aquitaine
- Coordinates: 45°21′37″N 2°20′15″E
- Country: France
- Region: Nouvelle-Aquitaine
- Department: Corrèze
- Arrondissement: Ussel
- Canton: Haute-Dordogne
- Intercommunality: Haute-Corrèze Communauté

Government
  - Mayor (2020–2026): Pierre Mathes
- Area^{1}: 34.48 km^{2} (13.31 sq mi)
- Population (2023): 343
  - Density: 9.95/km^{2} (25.8/sq mi)
- Time zone: UTC+01:00 (CET)
  - Summer (DST): UTC+02:00 (CEST)
- INSEE/Postal code: 19256 /19160
- ^{1} French Land Register data, which excludes lakes, ponds, glaciers > 1 km^{2} (0.386 sq mi or 247 acres) and river estuaries.

Sérandon (French pronunciation: [seʁɑ̃dɔ̃]; Occitan: Serendon) is a commune in the Corrèze department in central France.

== Geography ==
The Triouzoune forms the commune's western boundary, then flows into the Dordogne, which forms the commune's southeastern and eastern boundaries.

== Population ==
Historical population
Year	Pop.	±% p.a.
1968	507	—
1975	448	−1.75%
1982	379	−2.36%
1990	342	−1.28%
1999	332	−0.33%
2007	347	+0.55%
2012	369	+1.24%
2017	349	−1.11%
2023	343	−0.29%
Source: INSEE

== See also ==
- Communes of the Corrèze department
