= Valiergues =

- Commune
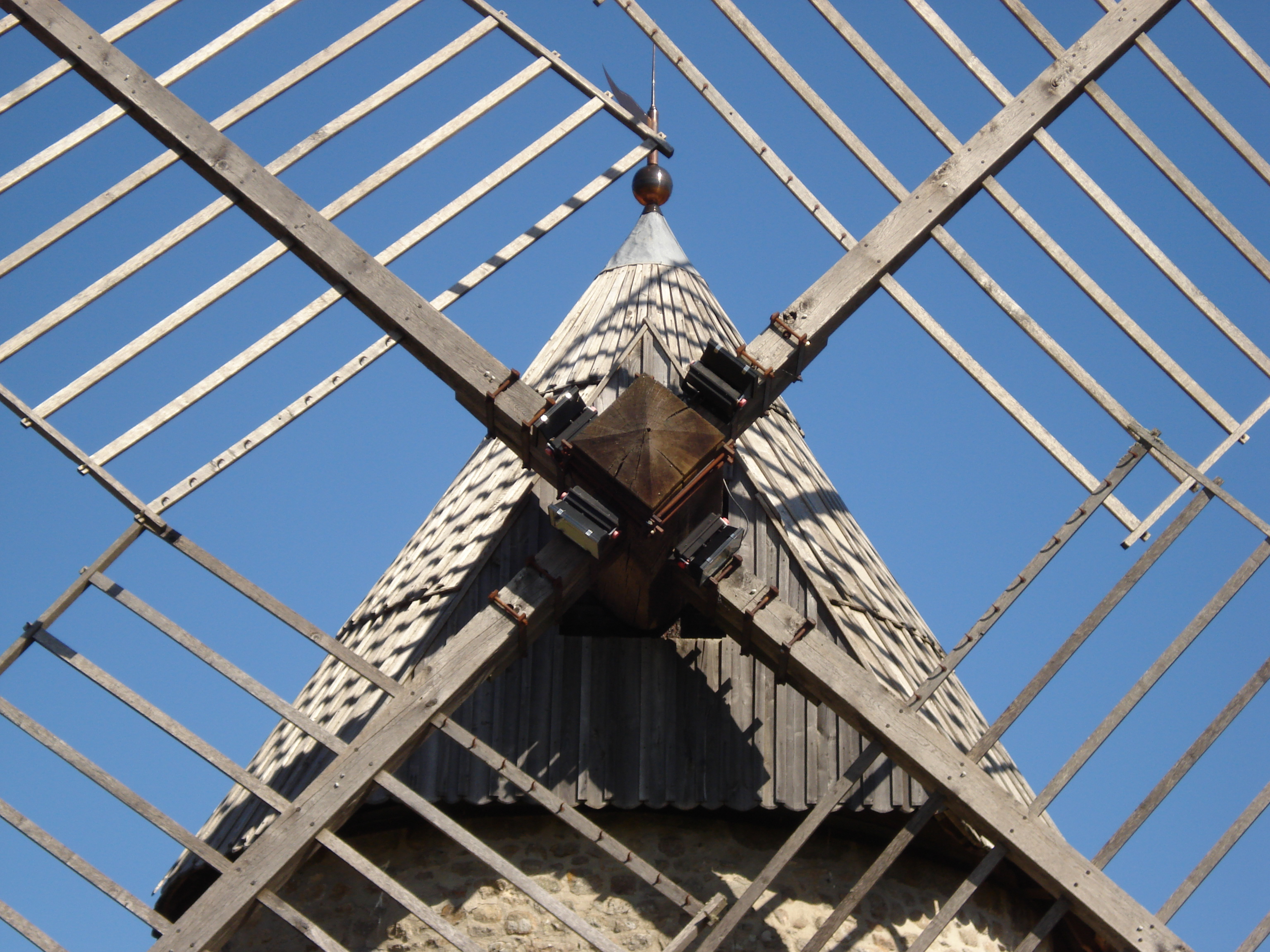
- Windmill

- Coat of arms
- Location of Valiergues
- Location within France Location within Nouvelle-Aquitaine
- Coordinates: 45°28′47″N 2°17′36″E
- Country: France
- Region: Nouvelle-Aquitaine
- Department: Corrèze
- Arrondissement: Ussel
- Canton: Haute-Dordogne
- Intercommunality: Haute-Corrèze Communauté

Government
  - Mayor (2020–2026): Daniel Delpy
- Area^{1}: 13.13 km^{2} (5.07 sq mi)
- Highest elevation: 720 m (2,360 ft)
- Lowest elevation: 612 m (2,008 ft)
- Population (2023): 157
  - Density: 12.0/km^{2} (31.0/sq mi)
- Time zone: UTC+01:00 (CET)
  - Summer (DST): UTC+02:00 (CEST)
- INSEE/Postal code: 19277 /19200
- ^{1} French Land Register data, which excludes lakes, ponds, glaciers > 1 km^{2} (0.386 sq mi or 247 acres) and river estuaries.

Valiergues (French pronunciation: [valjɛʁɡ]; Occitan: Valhergas) is a commune in the Corrèze department in central France.

== Geography ==
The Triouzoune forms part of the commune's southwestern boundary.

== Population ==
Historical population
Year	Pop.	±% p.a.
1968	106	—
1975	109	+0.40%
1982	120	+1.38%
1990	124	+0.41%
1999	121	−0.27%
2007	142	+2.02%
2012	146	+0.56%
2017	144	−0.28%
2023	157	+1.45%
Source: INSEE

== See also ==
- Communes of the Corrèze department
