= Palisse =

- Commune
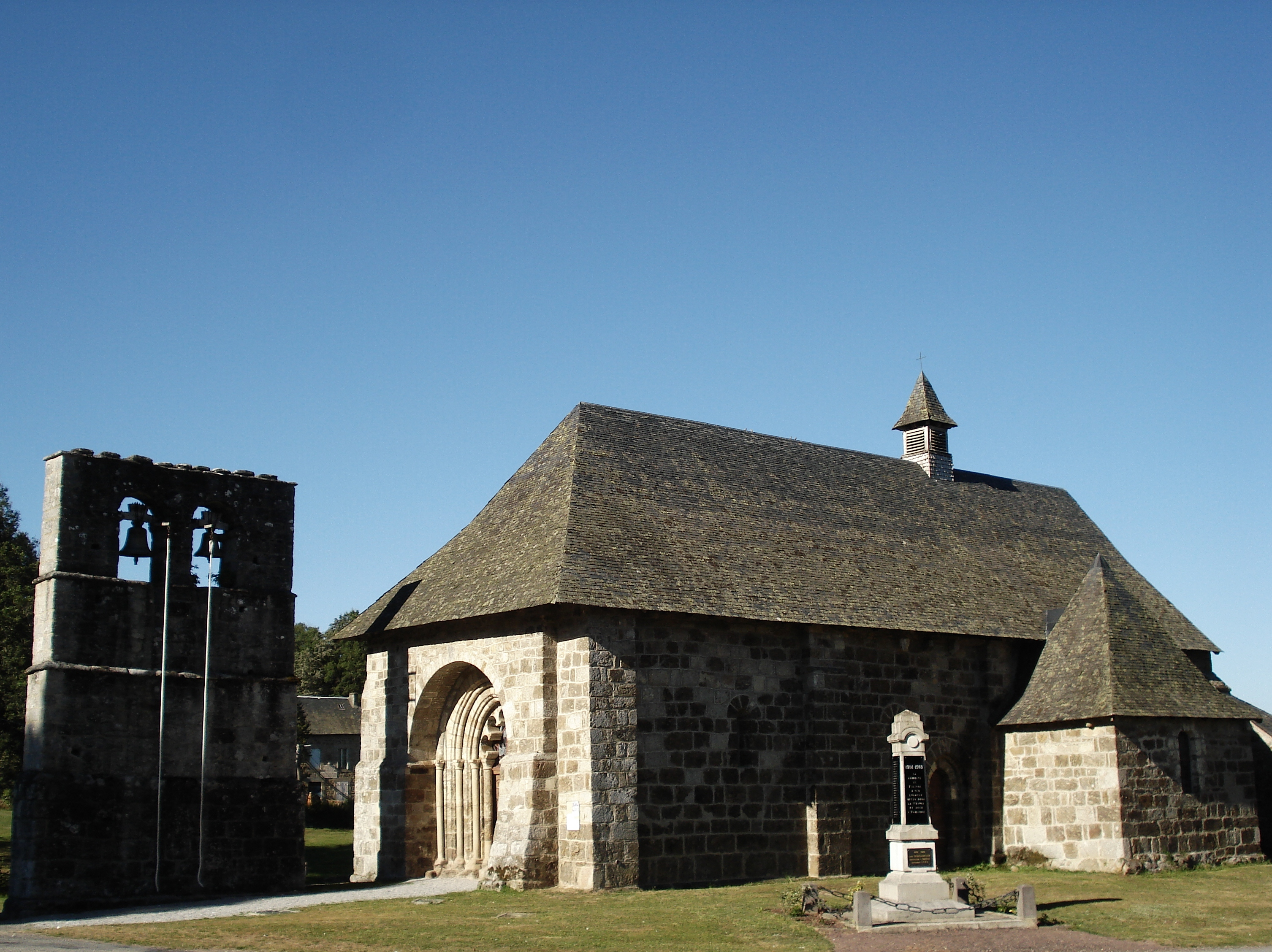
- The church in Palisse

- Coat of arms
- Location of Palisse
- Location within France Location within Nouvelle-Aquitaine
- Coordinates: 45°25′11″N 2°12′24″E
- Country: France
- Region: Nouvelle-Aquitaine
- Department: Corrèze
- Arrondissement: Ussel
- Canton: Haute-Dordogne
- Intercommunality: Haute-Corrèze Communauté

Government
  - Mayor (2020–2026): Stéphanie Gautier
- Area^{1}: 32.89 km^{2} (12.70 sq mi)
- Highest elevation: 706 m (2,316 ft)
- Lowest elevation: 511 m (1,677 ft)
- Population (2023): 224
  - Density: 6.81/km^{2} (17.6/sq mi)
- Time zone: UTC+01:00 (CET)
  - Summer (DST): UTC+02:00 (CEST)
- INSEE/Postal code: 19157 /19160
- ^{1} French Land Register data, which excludes lakes, ponds, glaciers > 1 km^{2} (0.386 sq mi or 247 acres) and river estuaries.

Palisse (French pronunciation: [palis]; Occitan: Paliça) is a commune in the Corrèze department in central France.

== Geography ==
The Triouzoune flows south-southeast through the eastern part of the commune. The Vianon flows south through the middle of the commune. The Luzège forms part of the commune's western boundary.

== Population ==
Historical population
Year	Pop.	±% p.a.
1968	293	—
1975	277	−0.80%
1982	260	−0.90%
1990	256	−0.19%
1999	226	−1.38%
2007	229	+0.16%
2012	235	+0.52%
2017	225	−0.87%
2023	224	−0.07%
Source: INSEE

== See also ==
- Communes of the Corrèze department
