= Triouzoune =

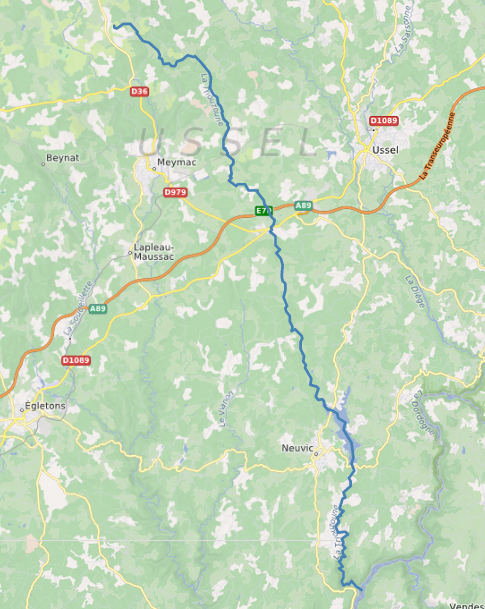

Location
- Country: France

Physical characteristics
- Source
  - location: Saint-Sulpice-les-Bois
  - coordinates: 45°37′07″N 02°07′32″E
  - elevation: 870 m (2,850 ft)
- Mouth
  - location: Dordogne
  - coordinates: 45°18′40″N 02°18′14″E
  - elevation: 340 m (1,120 ft)
- Length: 50.9 km (31.6 mi)
- Basin size: 130 km^{2} (50 sq mi)
- Discharge
  - average: 1.76 m^{3}/s (62 cu ft/s)

Basin features
- Progression: Dordogne→ Gironde estuary→ Atlantic Ocean

The Triouzoune (French pronunciation: [tʁijuzun]; Occitan: Triusona) is a 50.9 km (31.6 mi) long river in the Corrèze département, south-central France. Its source is on the Plateau de Millevaches, 1 km (0.62 mi) north of la Rigaudie, a hamlet in Saint-Sulpice-les-Bois. It flows generally south-southeast. It is a right tributary of the Dordogne into which it flows between Neuvic and Sérandon.

== Communes along its course ==
This list is ordered from source to mouth: Saint-Sulpice-les-Bois, Saint-Germain-Lavolps, Meymac, Alleyrat, Saint-Angel, Valiergues, Palisse, Neuvic, Liginiac, Sérandon
