= Alleyrat, Corrèze =

Alleyrat
- Commune
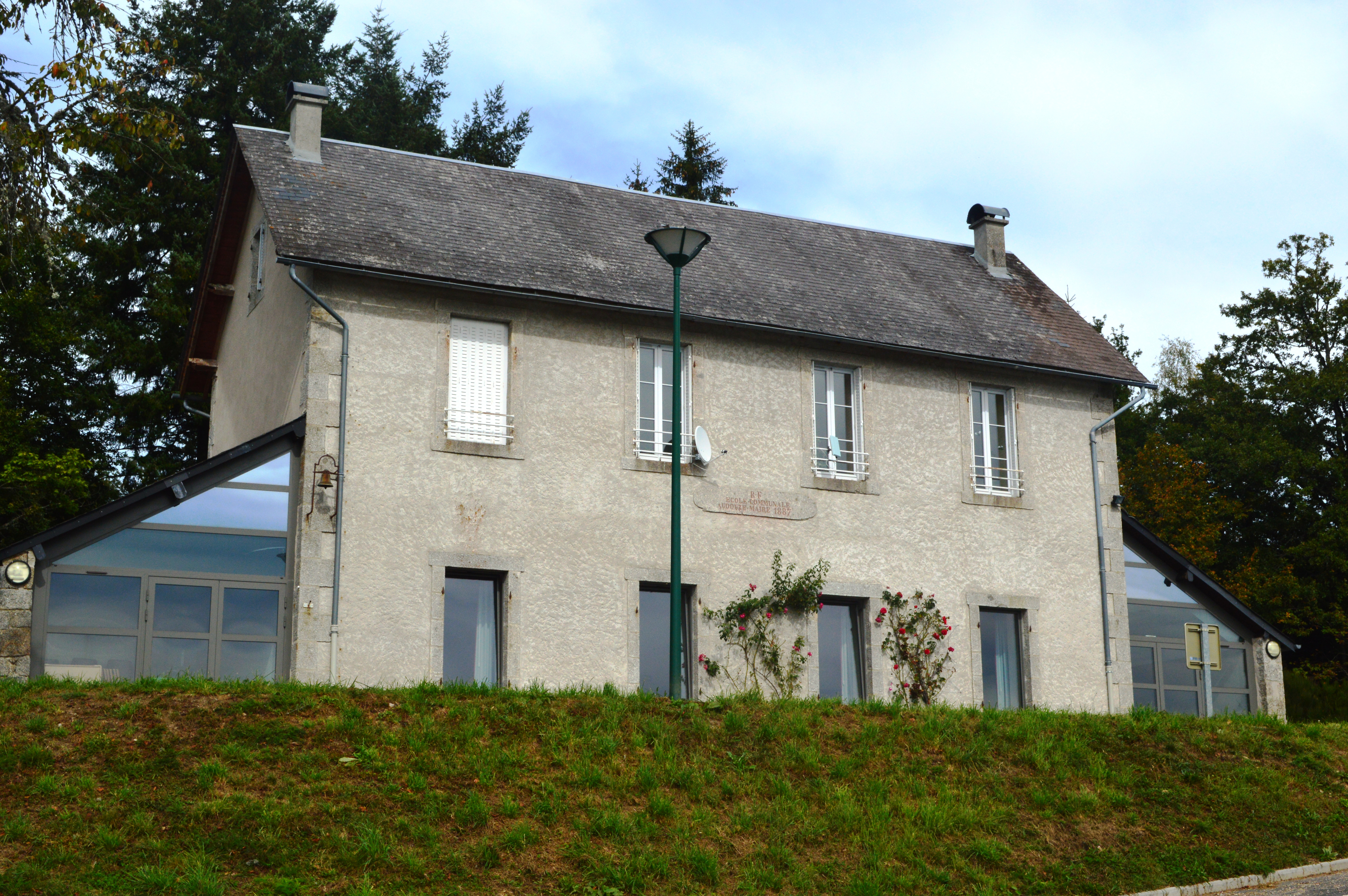
- The old School

- Coat of arms
- Location of Alleyrat
- Location within France Location within Nouvelle-Aquitaine
- Coordinates: 45°34′40″N 2°12′56″E
- Country: France
- Region: Nouvelle-Aquitaine
- Department: Corrèze
- Arrondissement: Ussel
- Canton: Plateau de Millevaches
- Intercommunality: Haute-Corrèze Communauté

Government
  - Mayor (2020–2026): Serge Peyraud
- Area^{1}: 14.76 km^{2} (5.70 sq mi)
- Elevation: 750 m (2,460 ft)
- Highest elevation: 844 m (2,769 ft)
- Lowest elevation: 654 m (2,146 ft)
- Population (2023): 98
  - Density: 6.6/km^{2} (17/sq mi)
- Time zone: UTC+01:00 (CET)
  - Summer (DST): UTC+02:00 (CEST)
- INSEE/Postal code: 19006 /19200
- ^{1} French Land Register data, which excludes lakes, ponds, glaciers > 1 km^{2} (0.386 sq mi or 247 acres) and river estuaries.

Alleyrat (French pronunciation: [alɛʁa]; Occitan: Alairac) is a commune in the Corrèze department, in the Nouvelle-Aquitaine region of central France.

== Geography ==
Alleyrat is located 8 km north-east of Meymac, 11 km north-west of Ussel, and 13 km south of Sornac. Access to the commune is by the D102 road, which runs off the D30 west of the commune and passes south-east through the village to join the D57 road in the east. The D57 also passes through the commune in the south from east to west where it joins the D30 just north of Meymac. Apart from the village there are a number of hamlets. These are: Enclisse, Ceppe, Le Soulier, Roumignac, and La Chassagne. The commune is about equally split between forest and farmland.

The commune is part of the Regional Natural Park of Millevaches in Limousin.

The river Triouzoune flows south along the western border gathering a number of tributaries which rise in the commune before continuing south to join the Dordogne. Numerous streams rise in the commune - mostly to join the Triouzoune - but some flow east to join the river Diège.

=== Heraldry ===
Arms of Alleyrat	Blazon: Or, a bend azure charged with 3 garden lilies of argent stalked and leaved the same posed in bend.

== Administration ==
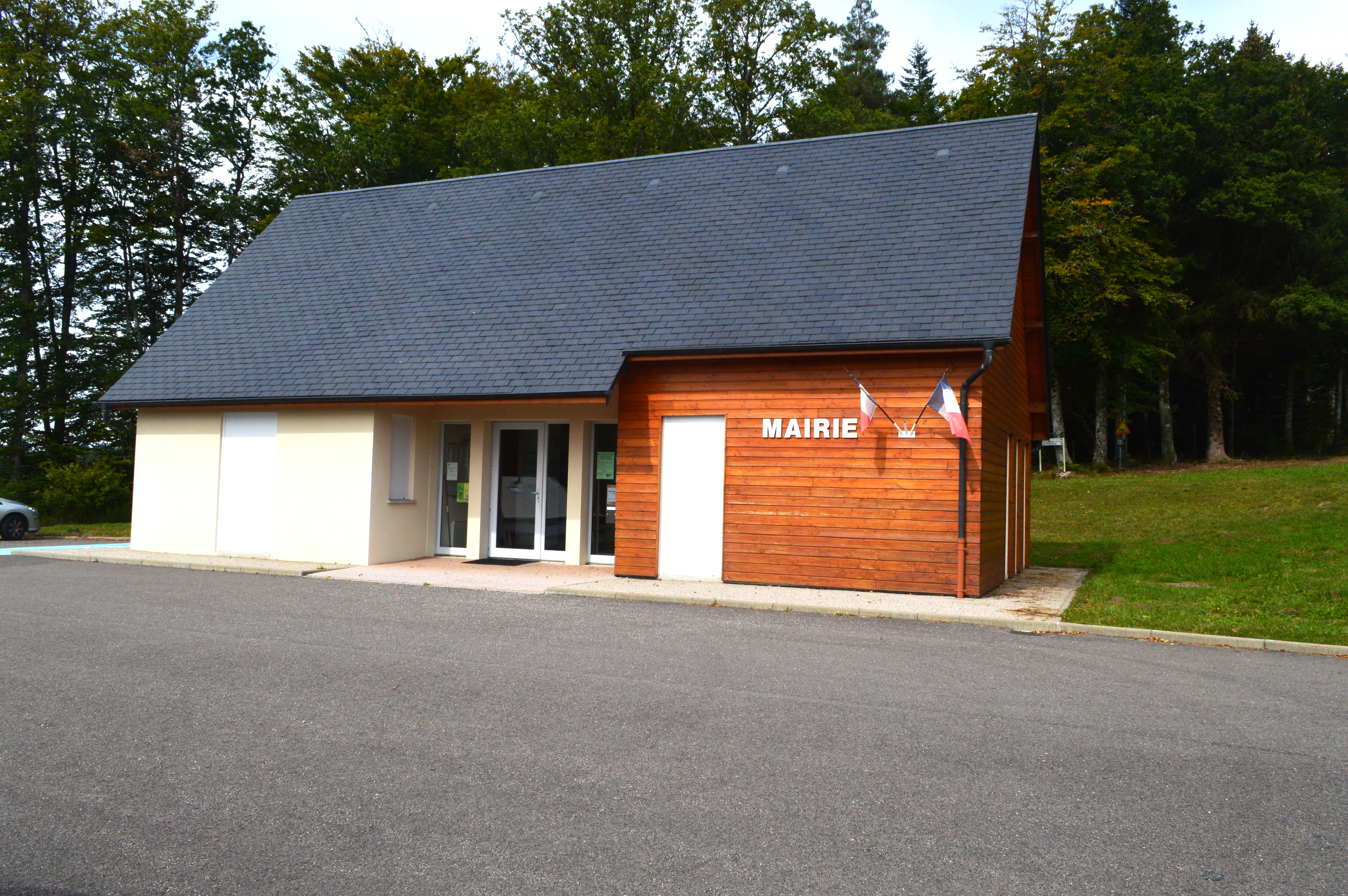
The Town Hall

List of Successive Mayors

From	To	Name
2001	2008	Joseph Ledieu
2008	2026	Serge Peyraud

== Population ==
The inhabitants of the commune are known as Alleyratois or Alleyratoises in French.

Historical population
Year	Pop.	±% p.a.
1968	130	—
1975	102	−3.41%
1982	83	−2.90%
1990	96	+1.84%
1999	99	+0.34%
2007	103	+0.50%
2012	100	−0.59%
2017	98	−0.40%
2023	98	+0.00%
Source: INSEE

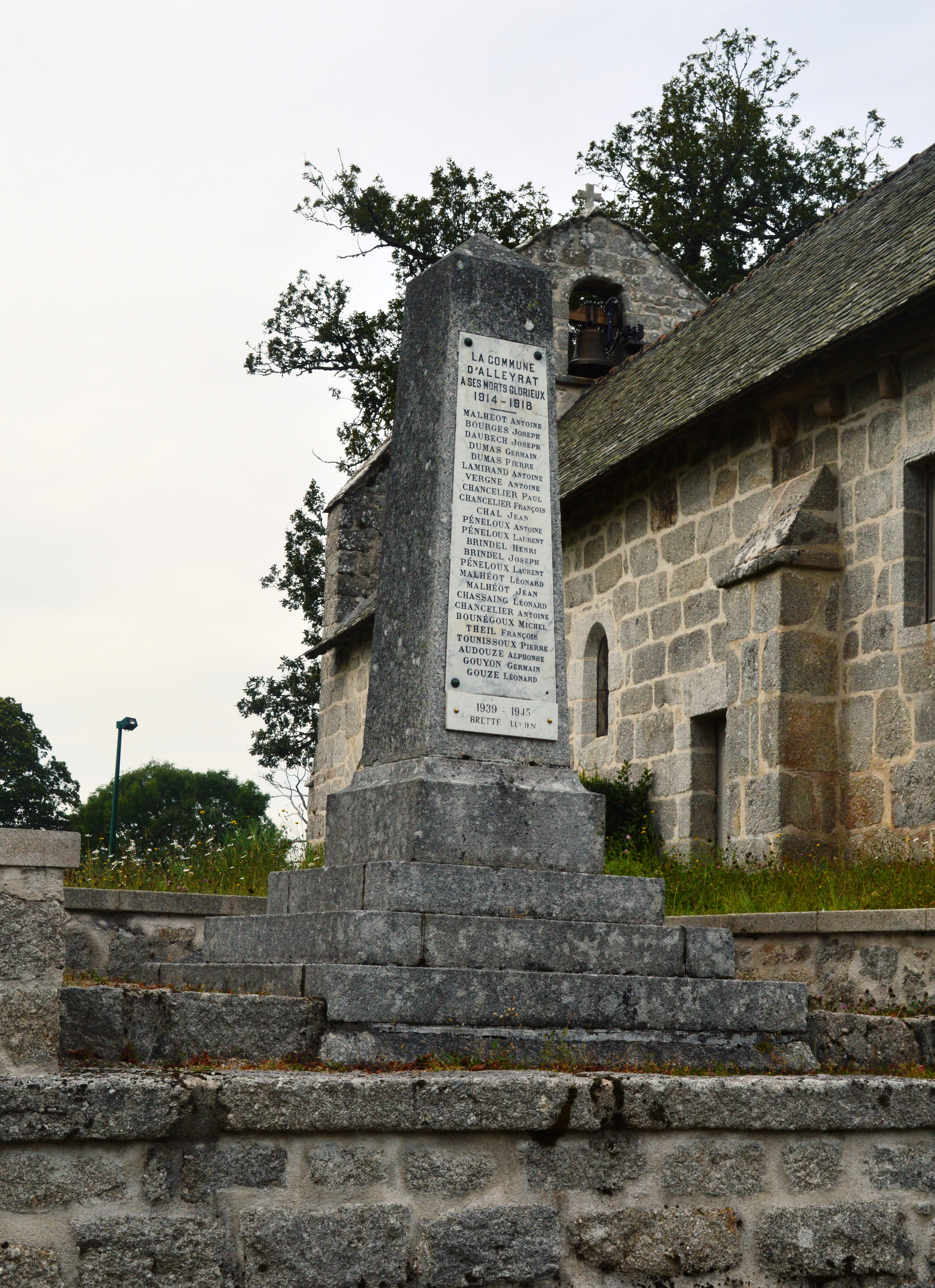
Alleyrat War Memorial

== Culture and heritage ==
=== Civil heritage ===
The commune has a number of buildings and structures that are registered as historical monuments:

- A Farmhouse at La Virolle (1815)
- A Farmhouse at Lespinasse (1811)
- A Farmhouse at Ceppe (1859)
- A Fountain (18th century)
- Mills (19th century)
- Farmhouses (19th century)

=== Religious heritage ===
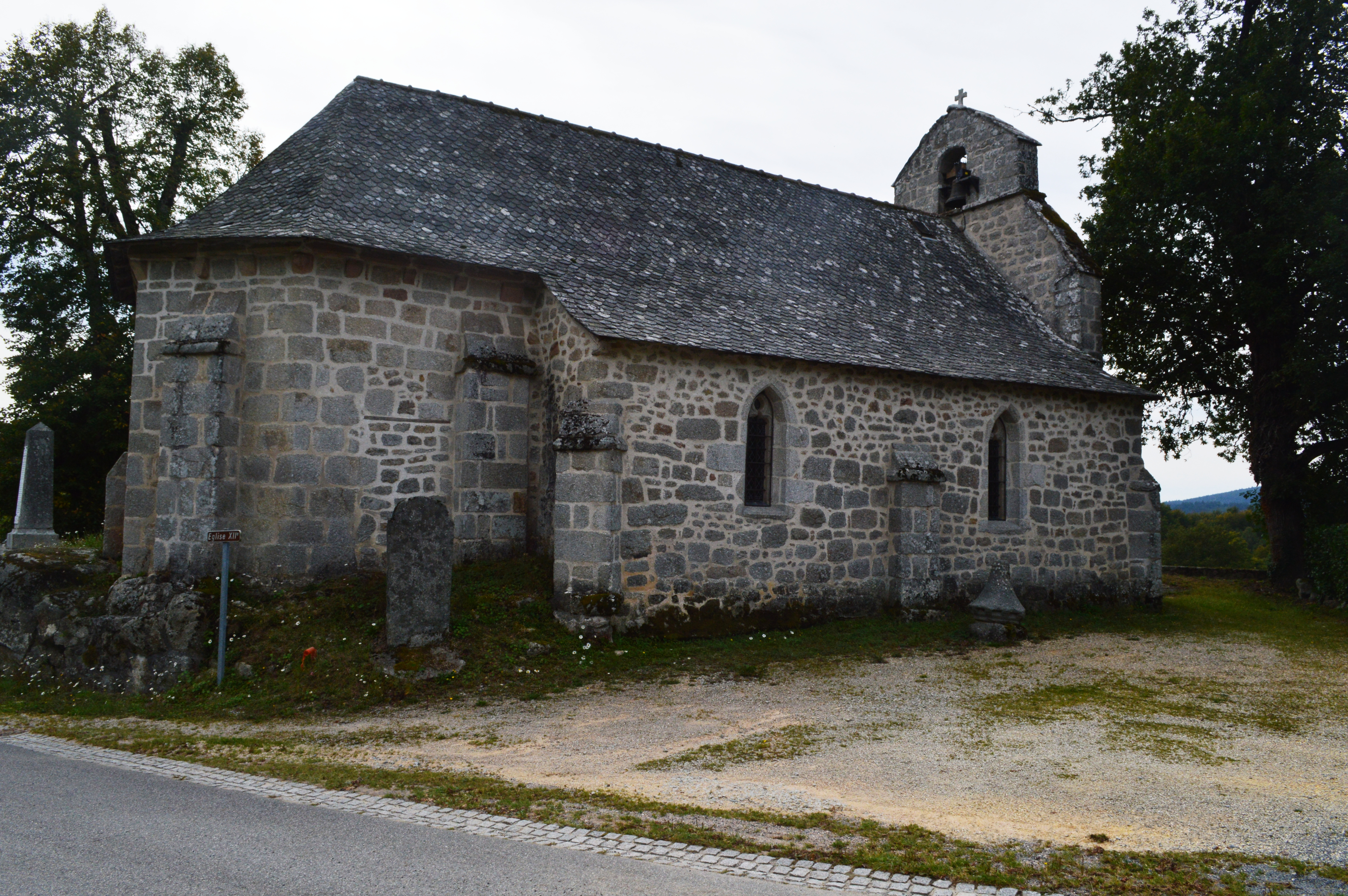
The Church of Saint Pierre

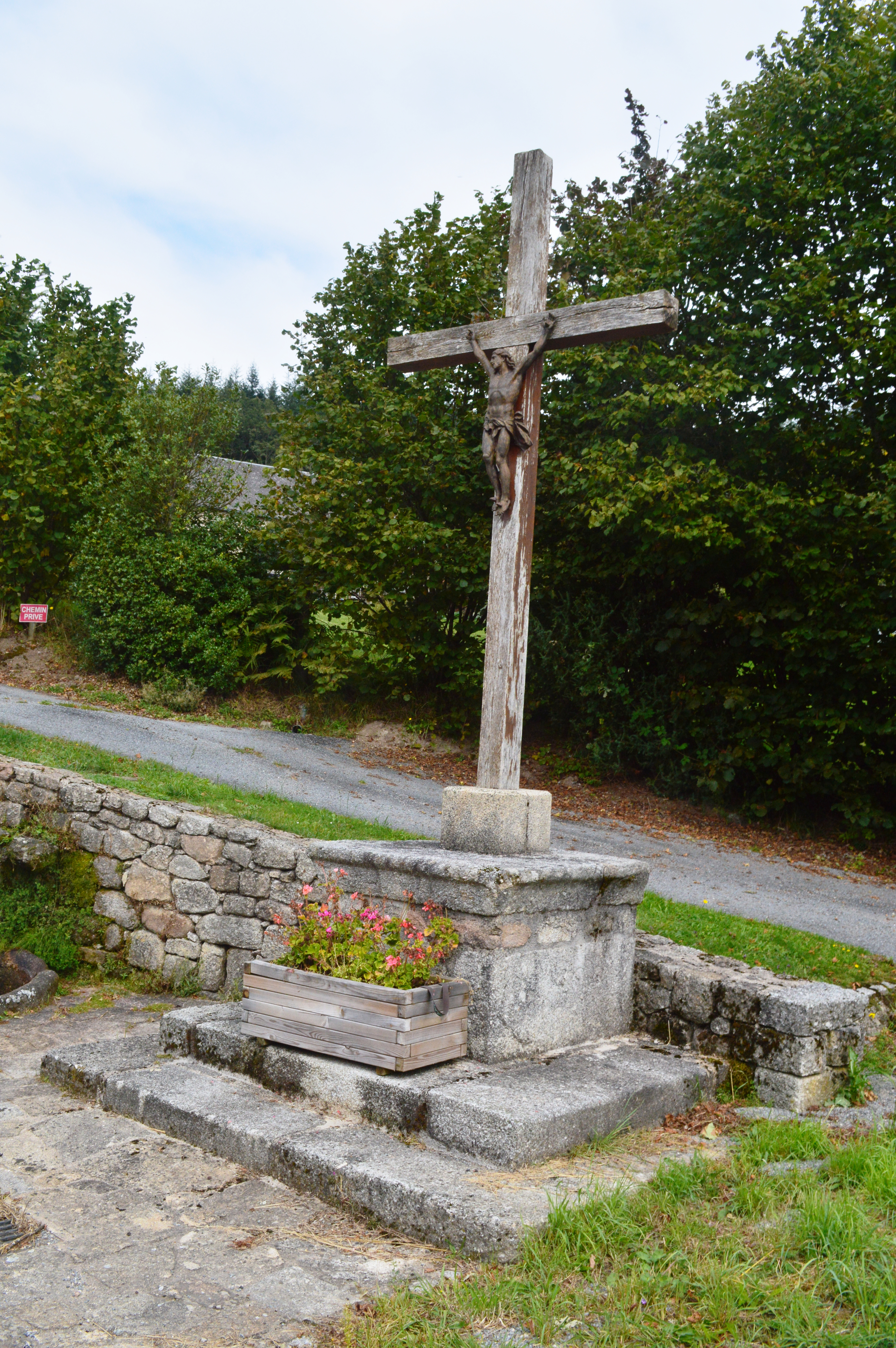
A Monumental Cross at Alleyrat

The commune has several religious buildings and structures that are registered as historical monuments:

- The Church of Saint Pierre (14th century)
- The Wayside Cross of Saint John (17th century)
- Monumental Crosses (17th and 20th centuries)

The Church of Saint Pierre contains many items that are registered as historical objects:

- The Furniture in the Church
- Part of the Cenotaph (Late Middle Ages)
- A Bronze bell (1877)
- 2 Altar vases
- A Processional Banner (1892)
- A Processional Banner (19th century)
- A Handbell (19th century)
- A Sunburst Monstrance (19th century)
- A Sunburst Monstrance (1819-1838)
- A Ciborium (1798-1809)
- A Chalice (19th century)
- A Paten (1798-1809)
- A Bust-Reliquary: Saint Pierre (17th century)
- A Statuette: Saint Pierre (18th century)
- A Statuette: Virgin and child (18th century)
- A Statuette: Virgin and child (18th century)
- A Monumental Painting in the vault of the choir (18th century)
- A Low Sideboard (18th century)
- A Pulpit (19th century)
- A Baptismal font (12th century)
- An Altar and Tabernacle (18th century)
- An Altar, Retable, and Tabernacle (18th century)

== See also ==
- Communes of the Corrèze department
