= Arboretum du Massif des Agriers =

Arboretum in Corrèze, Limousin, France

Coordinates: 45.6864°N 2.3574°E

The Arboretum du Massif des Agriers (4 hectares) is an arboretum located within the 600-hectare forest of the Massif des Agriers near Lamazière-Haute and Eygurande, Corrèze, Limousin, France. It contains about 60 conifers and deciduous trees planted in 1982.

== See also ==
- List of botanical gardens in France
