= Eygurande =

- Commune
- Coat of arms
- Location of Eygurande
- Location within France Location within Nouvelle-Aquitaine
- Coordinates: 45°39′44″N 2°27′10″E
- Country: France
- Region: Nouvelle-Aquitaine
- Department: Corrèze
- Arrondissement: Ussel
- Canton: Ussel
- Intercommunality: Haute-Corrèze Communauté

Government
  - Mayor (2020–2026): Didier Beaumont
- Area^{1}: 34.37 km^{2} (13.27 sq mi)
- Highest elevation: 904 m (2,966 ft)
- Lowest elevation: 709 m (2,326 ft)
- Population (2023): 678
  - Density: 19.7/km^{2} (51.1/sq mi)
- Time zone: UTC+01:00 (CET)
  - Summer (DST): UTC+02:00 (CEST)
- INSEE/Postal code: 19080 /19340
- ^{1} French Land Register data, which excludes lakes, ponds, glaciers > 1 km^{2} (0.386 sq mi or 247 acres) and river estuaries.

Eygurande (French pronunciation: [ɛɡyʁɑ̃d]; Occitan: Eiguranda) is a commune in the Corrèze department in central France.

== Population ==
Historical population
Year	Pop.	±% p.a.
1968	805	—
1975	791	−0.25%
1982	827	+0.64%
1990	794	−0.51%
1999	779	−0.21%
2007	710	−1.15%
2012	685	−0.71%
2017	685	+0.00%
2023	678	−0.17%
Source: INSEE

== Sights ==
- Arboretum du Massif des Agriers

== See also ==
- Communes of the Corrèze department
