= Lamazière-Haute =

- Commune
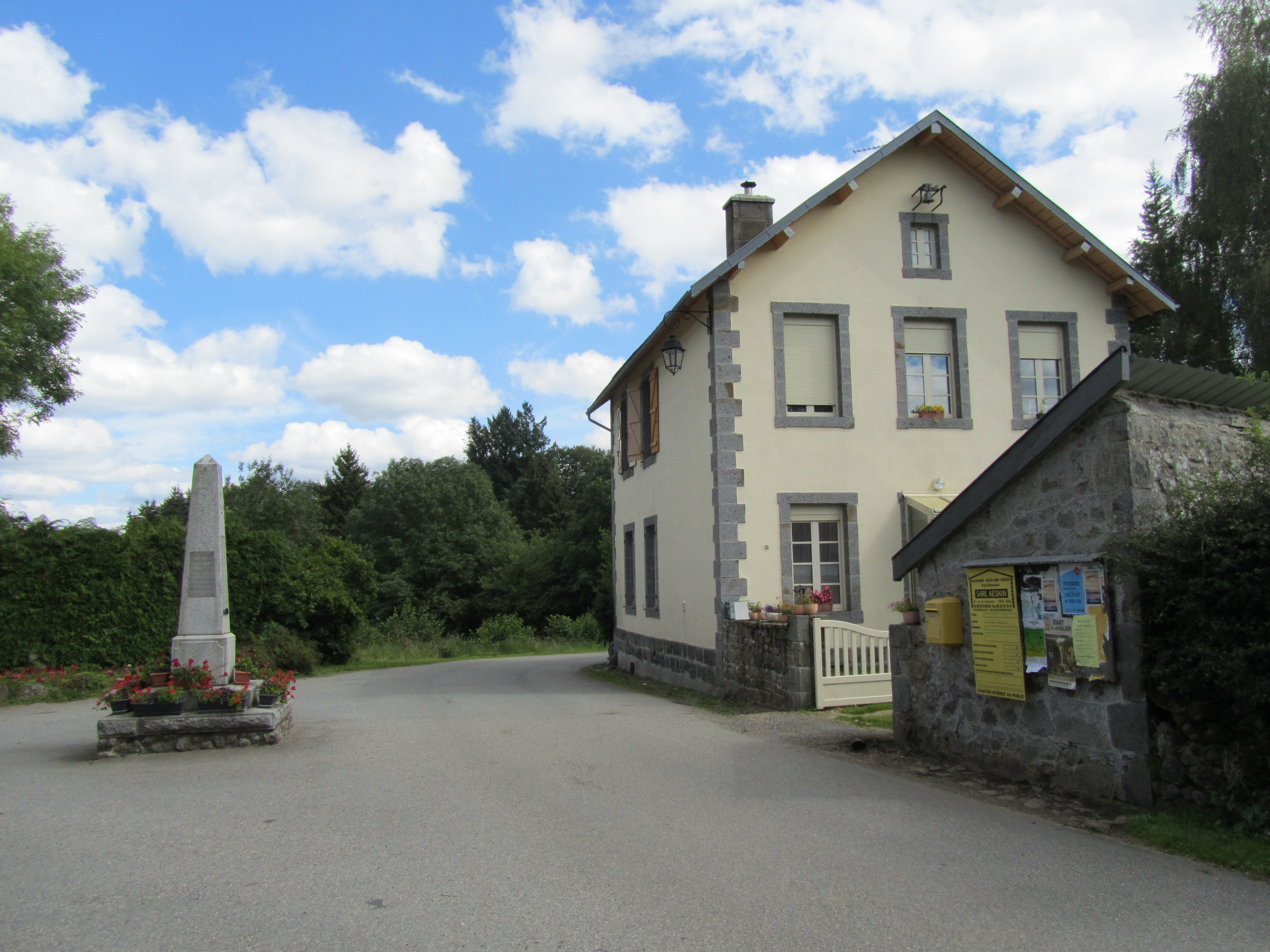
- The town hall and war memorial in Lamazière-Haute

- Coat of arms
- Location of Lamazière-Haute
- Location within France Location within Nouvelle-Aquitaine
- Coordinates: 45°40′16″N 2°23′50″E
- Country: France
- Region: Nouvelle-Aquitaine
- Department: Corrèze
- Arrondissement: Ussel
- Canton: Ussel
- Intercommunality: Haute-Corrèze Communauté

Government
  - Mayor (2020–2026): Jean-François Michon
- Area^{1}: 15.31 km^{2} (5.91 sq mi)
- Highest elevation: 916 m (3,005 ft)
- Lowest elevation: 746 m (2,448 ft)
- Population (2023): 65
  - Density: 4.2/km^{2} (11/sq mi)
- Time zone: UTC+01:00 (CET)
  - Summer (DST): UTC+02:00 (CEST)
- INSEE/Postal code: 19103 /19340
- ^{1} French Land Register data, which excludes lakes, ponds, glaciers > 1 km^{2} (0.386 sq mi or 247 acres) and river estuaries.

Lamazière-Haute (French pronunciation: [lamazjɛʁ lə ot]; Occitan: La Masiera Nauta) is a commune in the Corrèze department in central France.

== Population ==
Historical population
Year	Pop.	±% p.a.
1968	126	—
1975	100	−3.25%
1982	93	−1.03%
1990	82	−1.56%
1999	82	+0.00%
2007	73	−1.44%
2012	67	−1.70%
2017	67	+0.00%
2023	65	−0.50%
Source: INSEE

== Sights ==
- Arboretum du Massif des Agriers

== See also ==
- Communes of the Corrèze department
