= Saint-Fréjoux =

- Commune
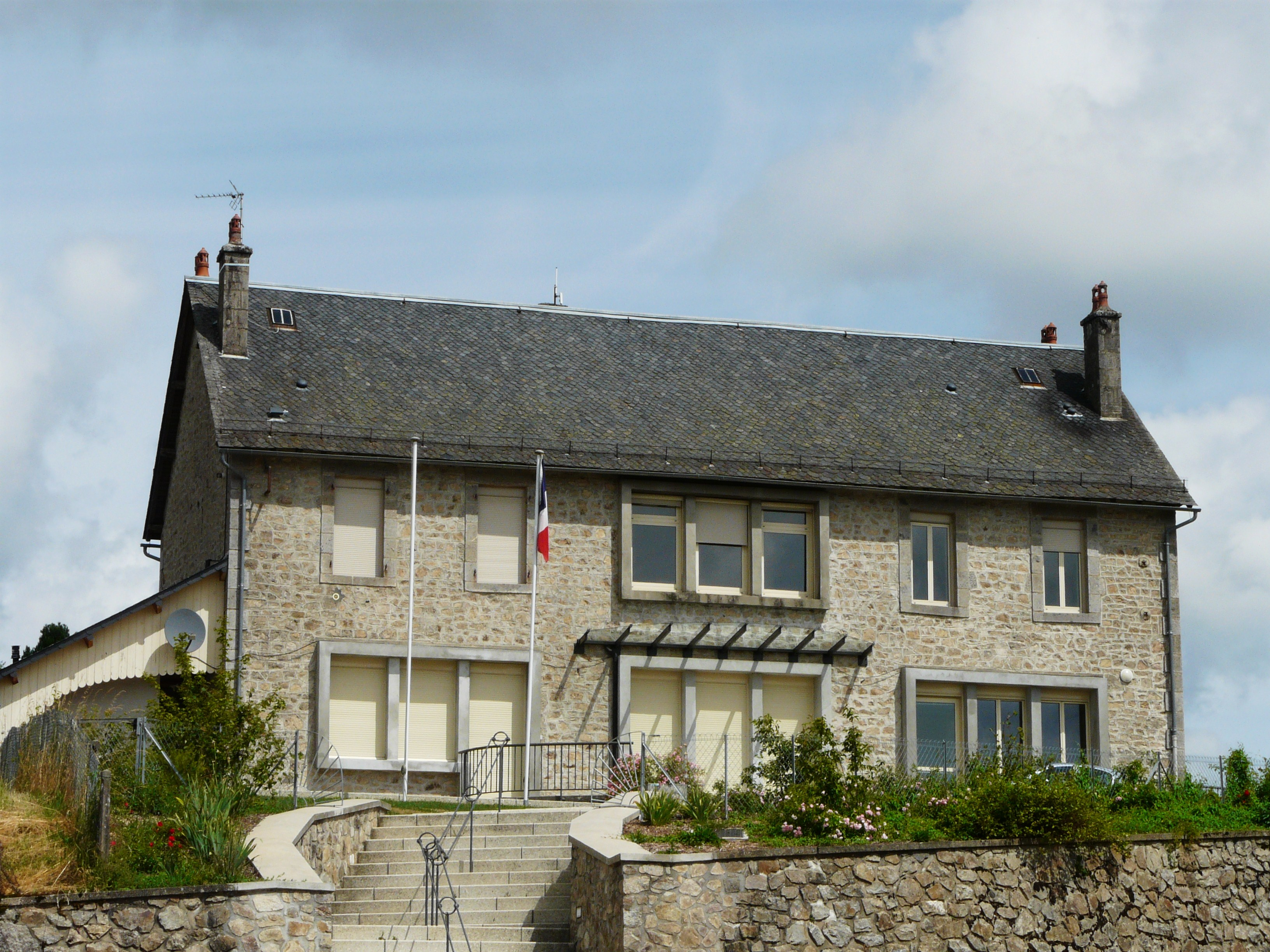
- The town hall in Saint-Fréjoux

- Coat of arms
- Location of Saint-Fréjoux
- Location within France Location within Nouvelle-Aquitaine
- Coordinates: 45°32′50″N 2°22′25″E
- Country: France
- Region: Nouvelle-Aquitaine
- Department: Corrèze
- Arrondissement: Ussel
- Canton: Haute-Dordogne
- Intercommunality: Haute-Corrèze Communauté

Government
  - Mayor (2020–2026): Stéphane Peyraud
- Area^{1}: 24.93 km^{2} (9.63 sq mi)
- Elevation: 695 m (2,280 ft)
- Highest elevation: 829 m (2,720 ft)
- Lowest elevation: 637 m (2,090 ft)
- Population (2023): 260
  - Density: 10/km^{2} (27/sq mi)
- Time zone: UTC+01:00 (CET)
  - Summer (DST): UTC+02:00 (CEST)
- INSEE/Postal code: 19204 /19200
- ^{1} French Land Register data, which excludes lakes, ponds, glaciers > 1 km^{2} (0.386 sq mi or 247 acres) and river estuaries.

Saint-Fréjoux (French pronunciation: [sɛ̃ fʁeʒu]; Occitan: Sent Frejolh) is a commune in the Corrèze department in central France.

== Population ==
Historical population
Year	Pop.	±% p.a.
1968	264	—
1975	252	−0.66%
1982	253	+0.06%
1990	283	+1.41%
1999	247	−1.50%
2007	269	+1.07%
2012	297	+2.00%
2017	291	−0.41%
2023	260	−1.86%
Source: INSEE

== See also ==
- Communes of the Corrèze department
