= Black Rocks Viaduct =

Black Rocks Viaduct Viaduc des Rochers Noirs
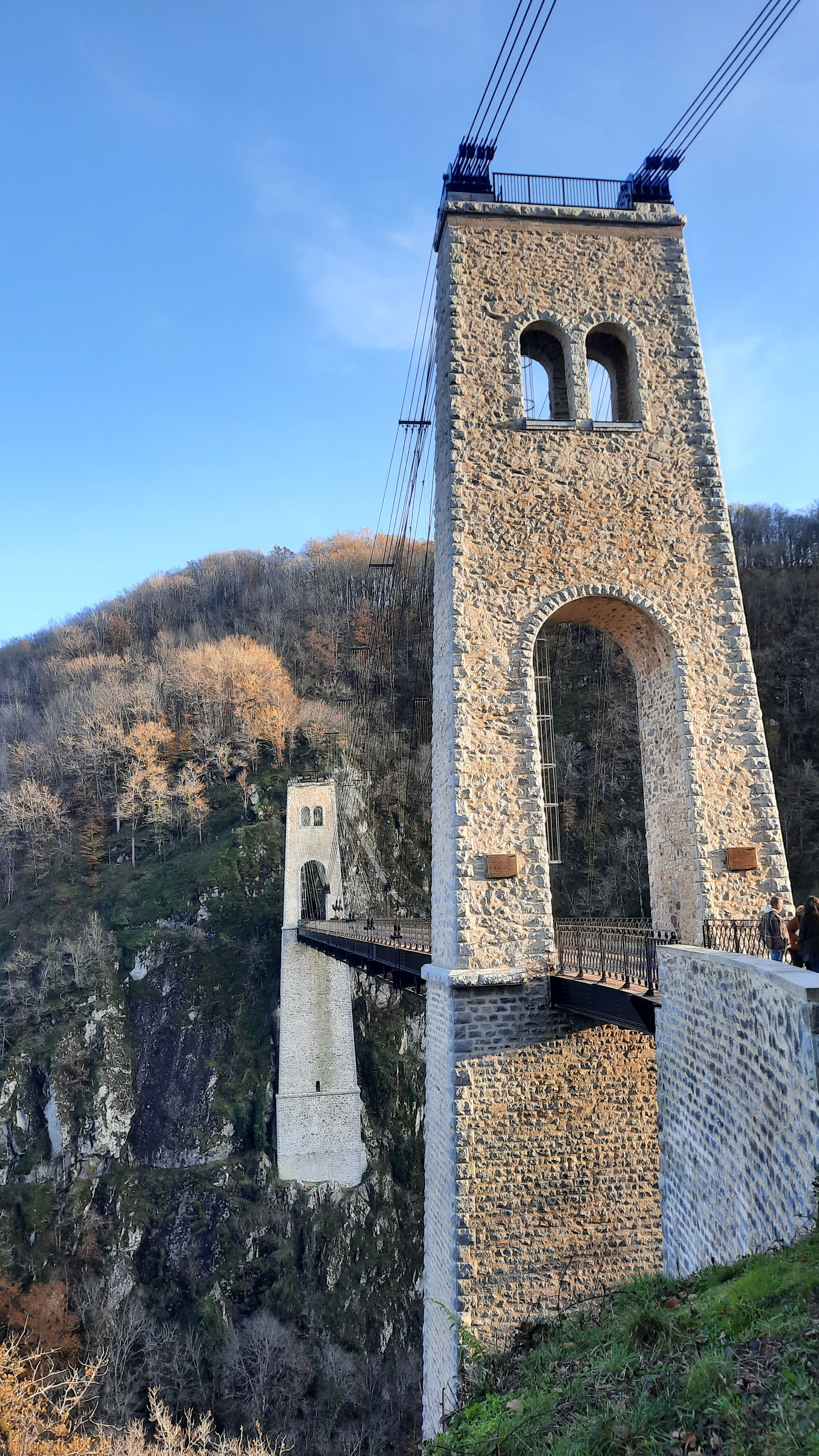
- The Black Rocks Viaduct in nov 2024
- Coordinates: 45°16′05″N 2°10′57″E
- Carries: Railway now pedestrians
- Crosses: Luzège
- Locale: Corrèze, Nouvelle Aquitaine region, France
- Heritage status: Historic Monument

Characteristics
- Design: suspension bridge
- Material: Quarried granite and steel
- Total length: 140 metres (460 ft)
- Height: 82 metres (269 ft)

History
- Designer: Gisclard Albert
- Constructed by: Ferdinand Arnodin
- Construction start: 1911; 115 years ago
- Opened: 11 September 1913; 113 years ago

Location
- Interactive map of Black Rocks Viaduct

The Black Rocks Viaduct (in French "Viaduc des Rochers Noirs") is a suspension bridge in France spanning the Luzège gorges, at the narrowest point, between Lapleau and Soursac in the Corrèze department. Originally, it was only used for rail transport and was part of the old Transcorrézien line, managed by the Corrèze tramways.

== History ==
The viaduct was designed according to the patent filed by Albert Gisclard and the work was carried out by the Ferdinand Arnodin company. The structure is part of the Transcorrézien railway line, inaugurated on 11 September 1913 in the presence of President Raymond Poincaré. It linked Tulle to Ussel by an eight-hour journey.

The construction of a classic suspension bridge, originally envisaged, was abandoned because of the lack of rigidity of such a structure, incompatible with the passage of heavy trains that could cause dangerous oscillations. In fact, a suspension bridge essentially comprises two bundles of parabolic load-bearing cables, flexible by nature, connected to the deck by vertical hangers. The rigidity of the structure can only be provided by the deck, which must therefore be reinforced.

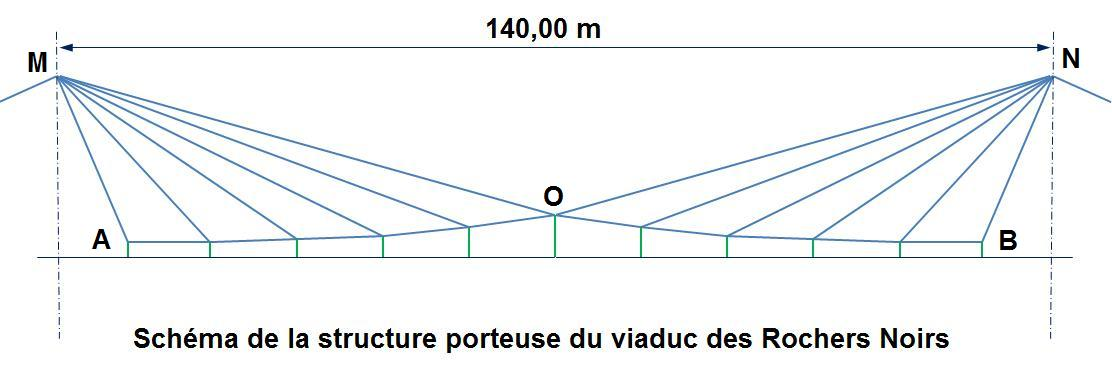
Schéma de la structure.

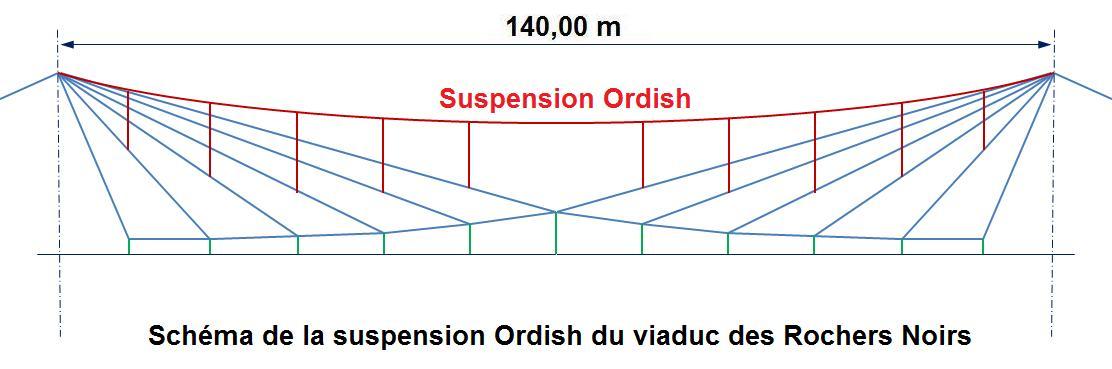
Schéma de la suspension Ordish.

The construction of long-span bridges was enriched in 1909 by the convincing results obtained on the fixed suspension bridge of Cassagne. A comparative study led to the conclusion that the Gisclard system should be adopted in view of the technical and economic advantages of this new type of bridge, foreshadowing current cable-stayed bridges. The bridge is supported by two longitudinal trusses made of metal cables. The arrangement of the cables constitutes the originality of the system. From the top of each of the two piers are fixed two layers of metal cables crossing in the middle of the main span where they are connected. The main cables continue their course approximately horizontally until near the opposite pier, then obliquely to the top of this pier. The main cables thus form two triangles (MOA and NOB on the sketch) linked together by a vertex at mid-span, and each at the top of the piers by another vertex. Inside each triangle are stretched 4 stays between the top of the pier and the horizontal base of the triangle. The geometry of the structure is determined so that the cables remain taut in all cases. The structure constitutes a geometrically undeformable and freely expandable assembly. The isostatic nature of the structure makes it easy to calculate the internal forces produced in each element. The structure is completed by the Ordish suspension, which further reduces deformations. This system consists of a parabolic cable stretched between the two piers above each truss, supporting each stay at several intermediate points by vertical hangers, which allows, by cancelling the deflection due to the self-weight, to make each stay almost straight. The metal deck, designed as a continuous beam, is suspended under the structure by vertical rods. The rigidity of the deck can thus be reduced to the minimum value required by the stability of the portion between two suspension points.

While the railway activity of the viaduct ceased on December 31, 1959, the bridge, which had become a road, was used by the D89 departmental road until 1983. From 1983, the viaduct was reserved for pedestrians.

The ASTTRE 19 Association was created on December 18, 1993 to defend the heritage represented by the Viaduct and the platform of the Corrézien Tramway.

The viaduct has been classified as a historical monument since December 6, 2004. From 2005 to September 2024, it was permanently closed to all traffic for safety reasons.

In 2014, a Himalayan footbridge was installed nearby to cross the Luzège, thus maintaining the continuity of the hiking route (GR de pays) between Soursac and Lapleau.

In 2020, it was included in the list of priority sites selected by the Stéphane Bern Mission, allowing the Fondation du Patrimoine to allocate €500,000 for initial work with the aim of ultimately reopening the site to the public.

Between 2022 and 2024, this work of art underwent major restoration work for an amount excluding tax of €9.8 million, with the aim of reopening to the public (soft mobility and emergency vehicles) in September 2024.

After two years of work and 19 years of closure, the Rochers Noirs viaduct was re-opened to the public during the heritage days 2024, on 21 September 2024. The work will also be used by the University of Limoge, the University Institute of Technology of Corrèze and the School of Application to Public Works Professions (EATP) of Egletons as an object of study and research for new monitoring technologies for bridges and tunnels

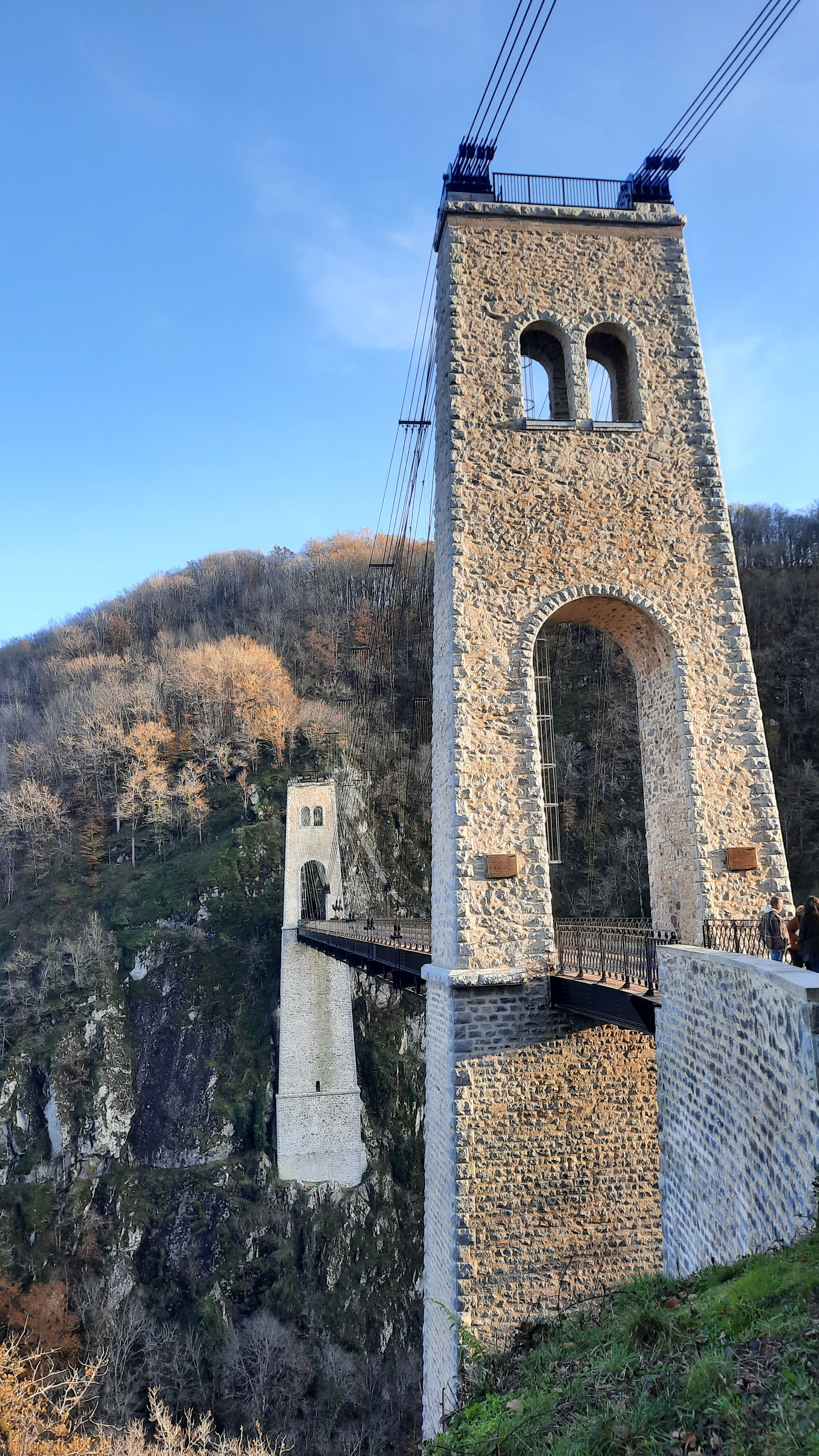
Viaduc des Rochers Noirs restored, Lapleau side.

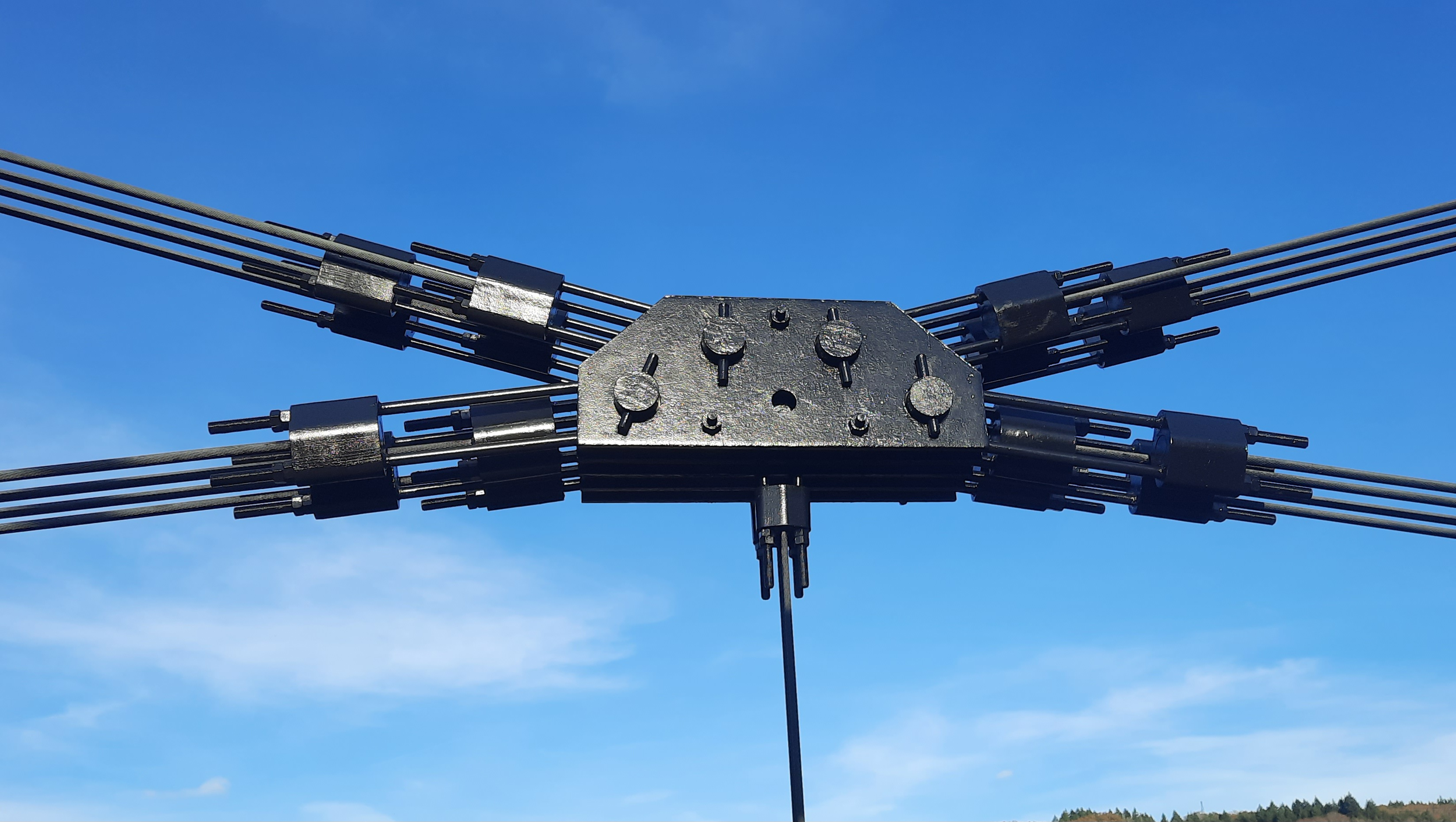
central links.

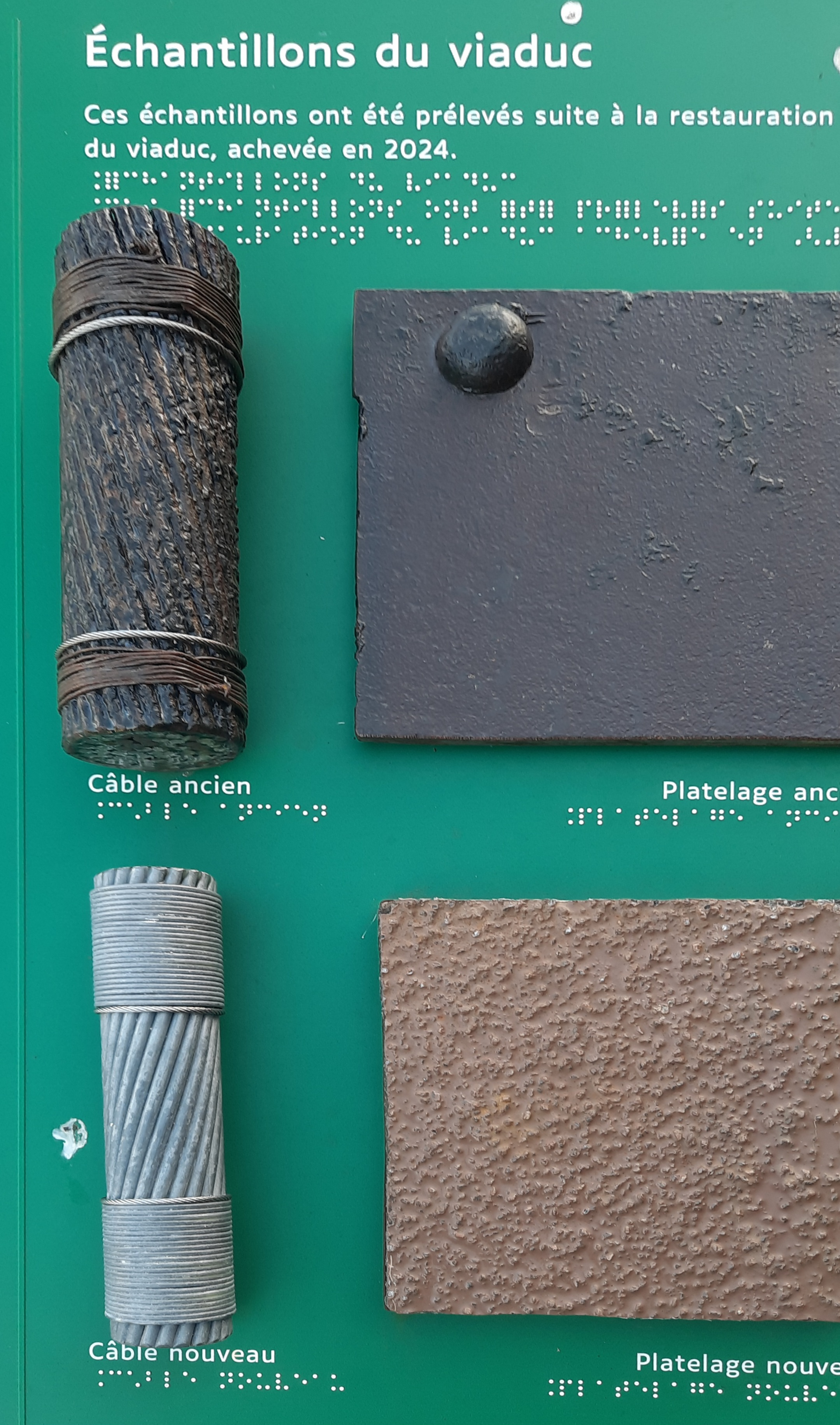
information panel .

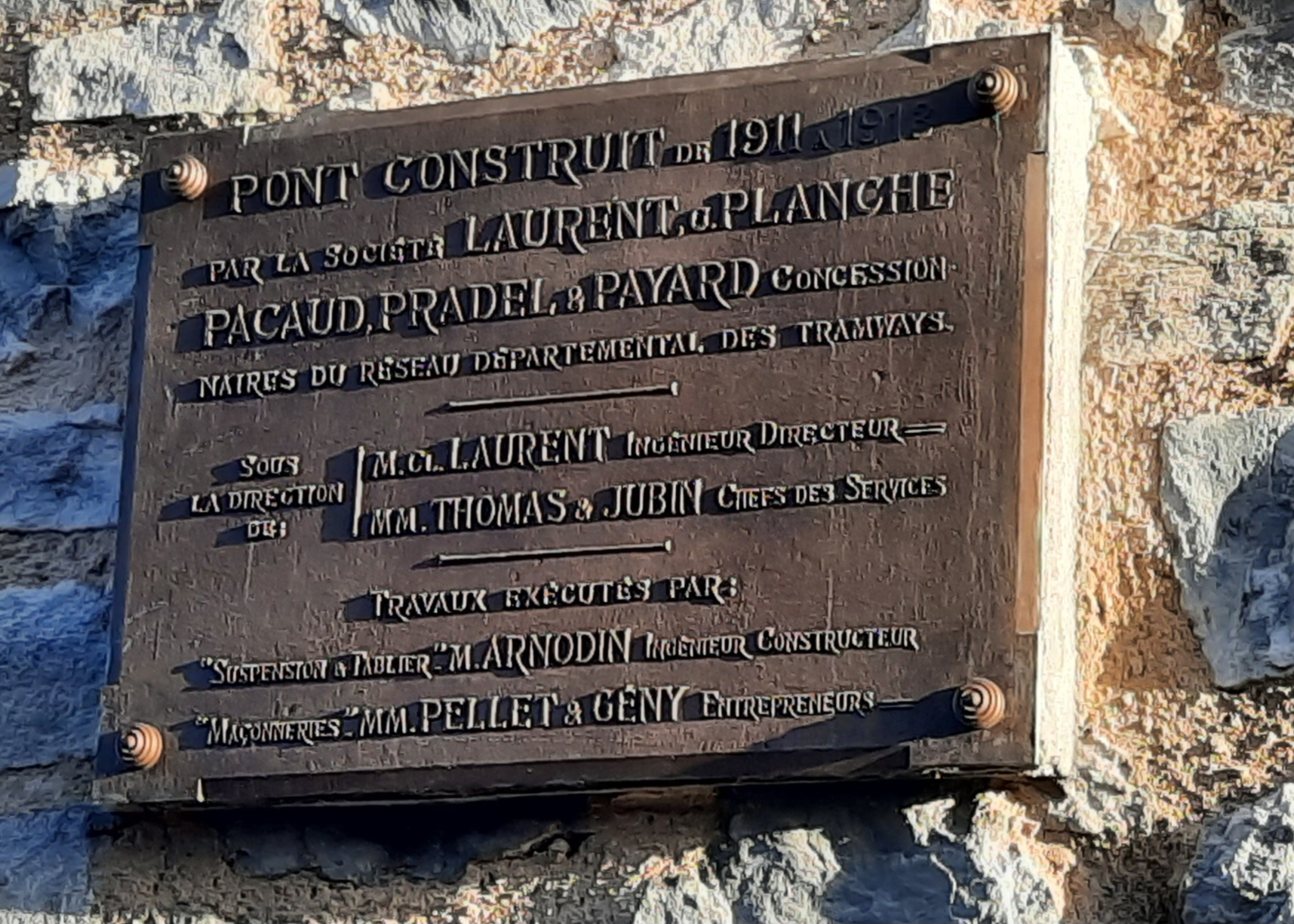
builders notice.

== Gallery ==
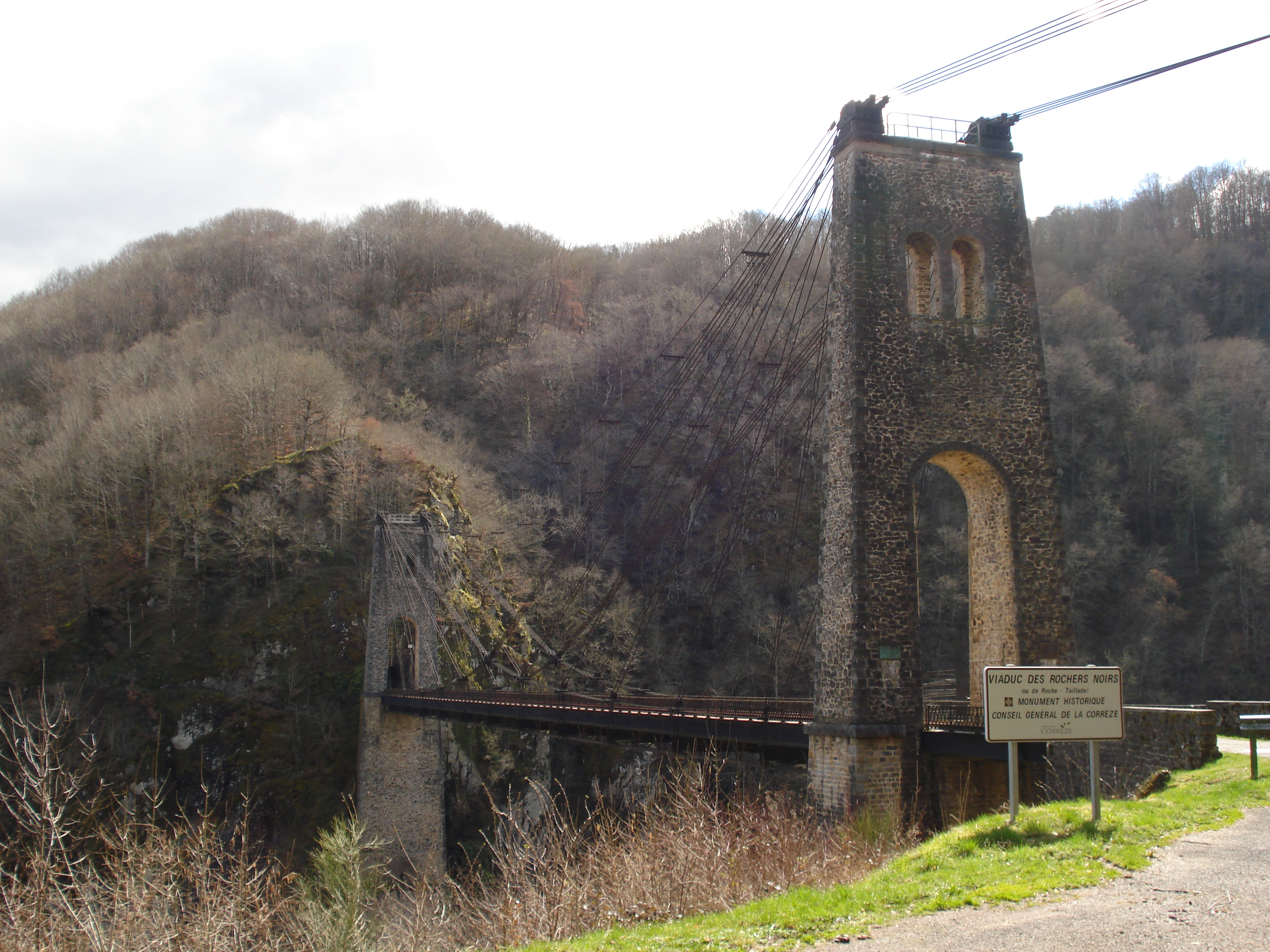
Viaduc des Rochers Noirs Lapleau side.

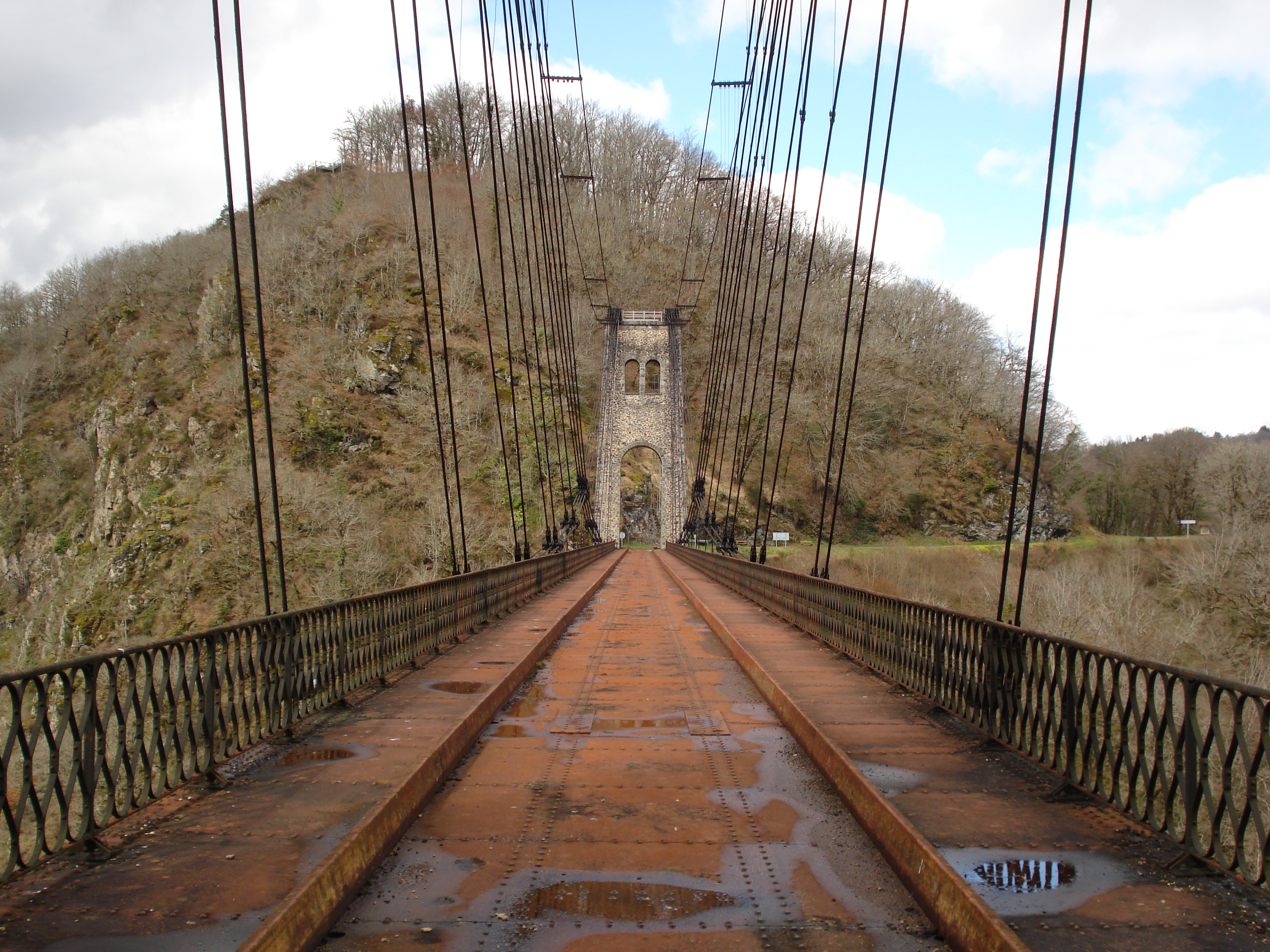
historic view before restoration

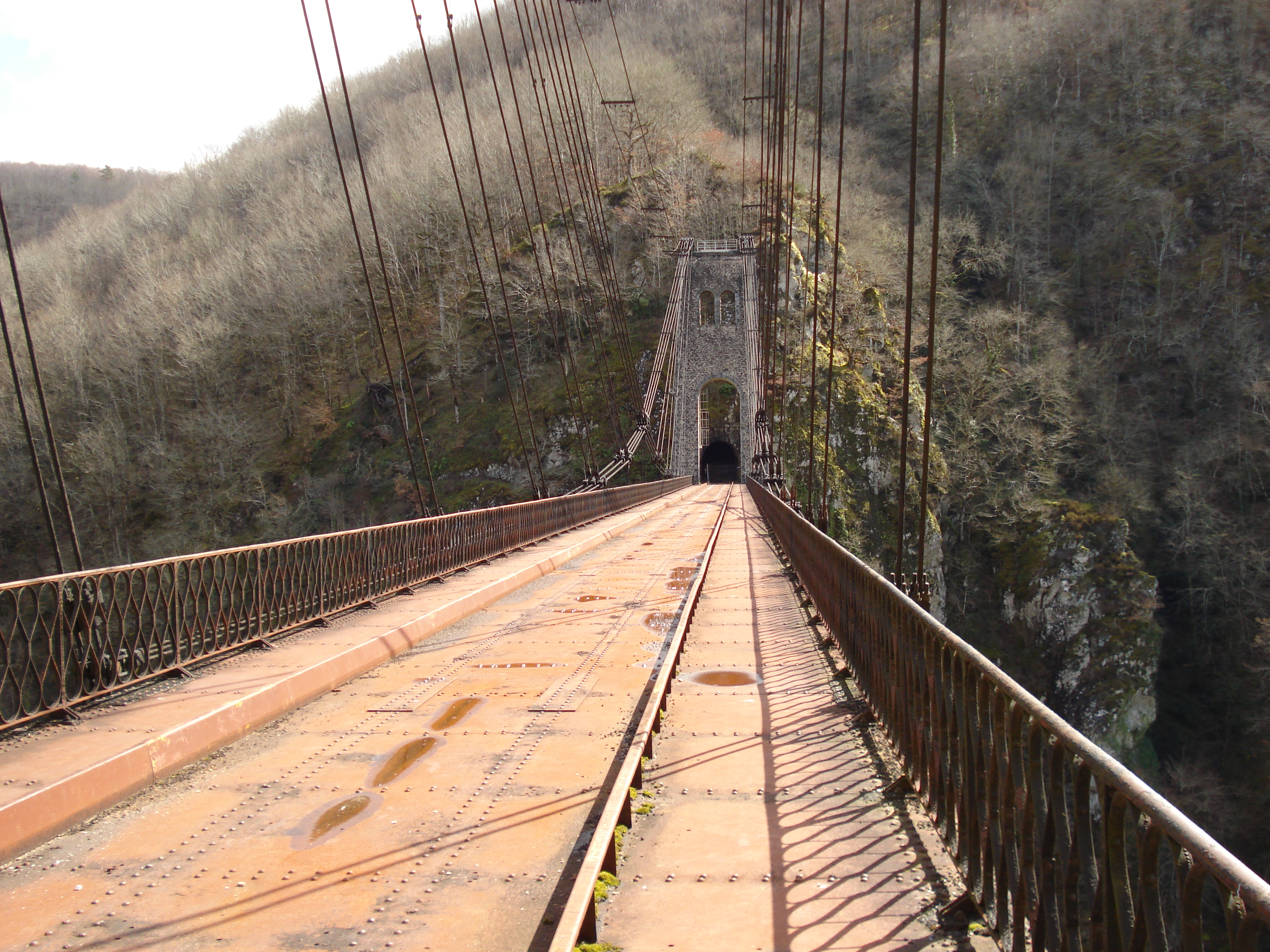

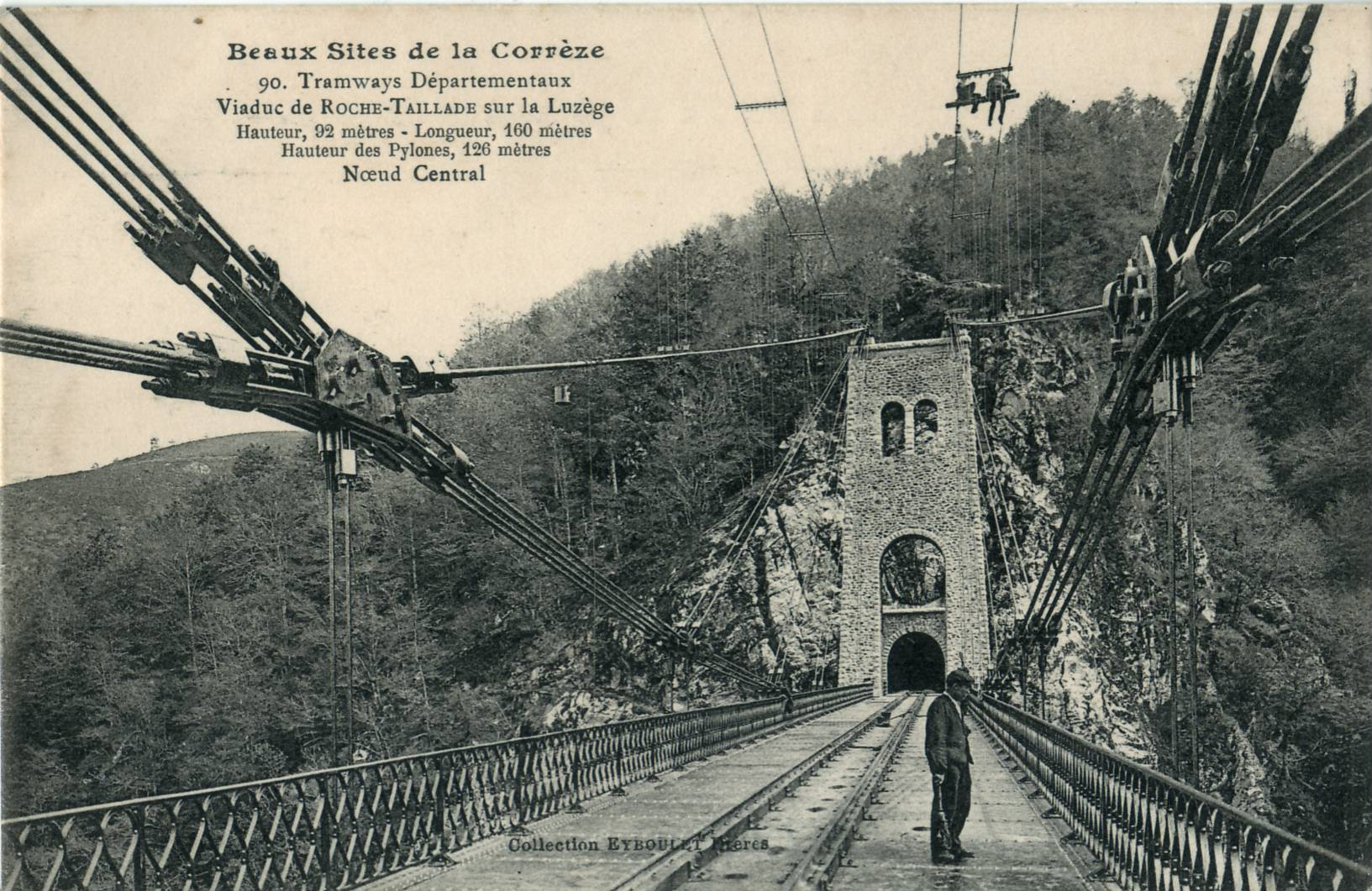

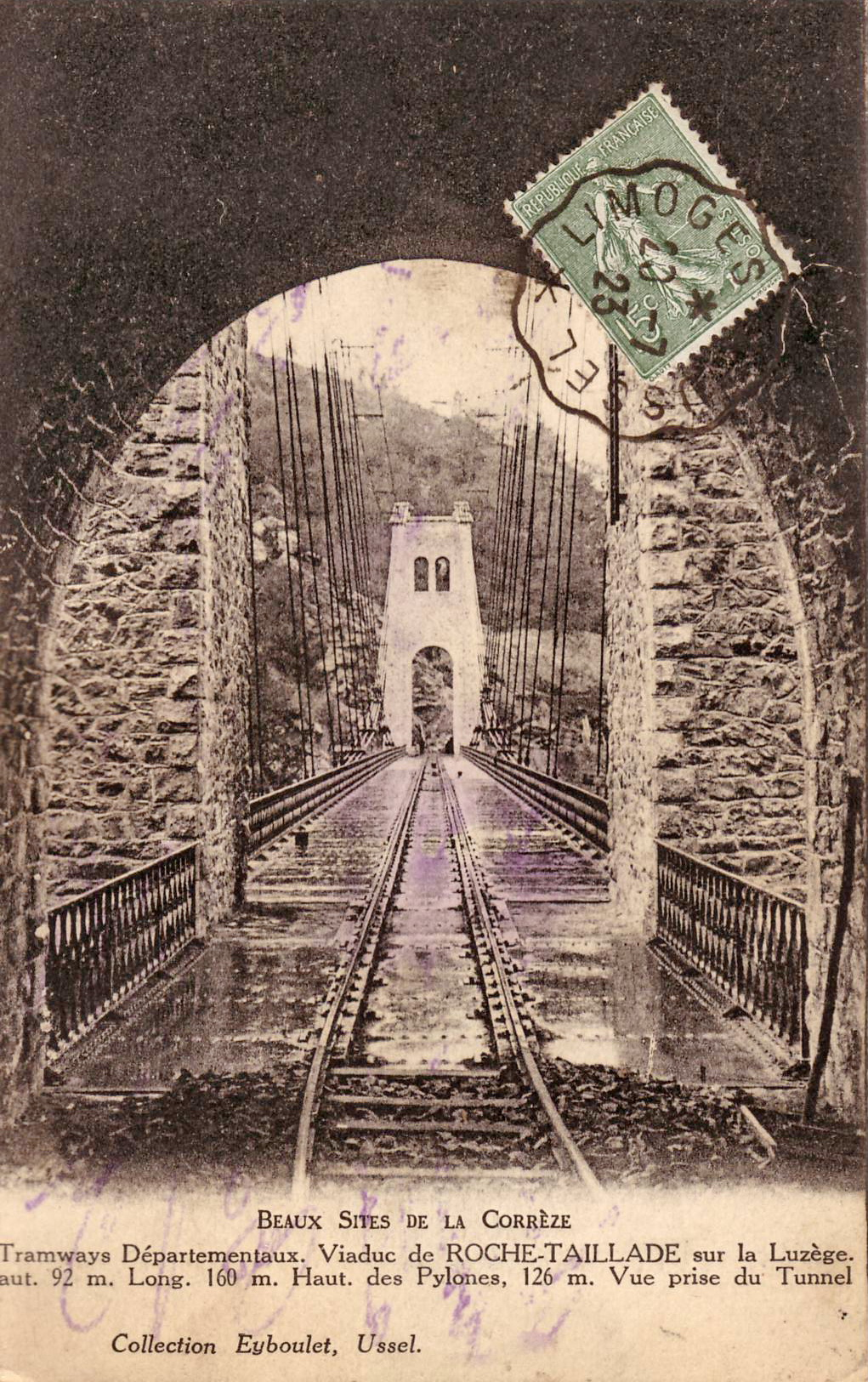
historic view with railway track

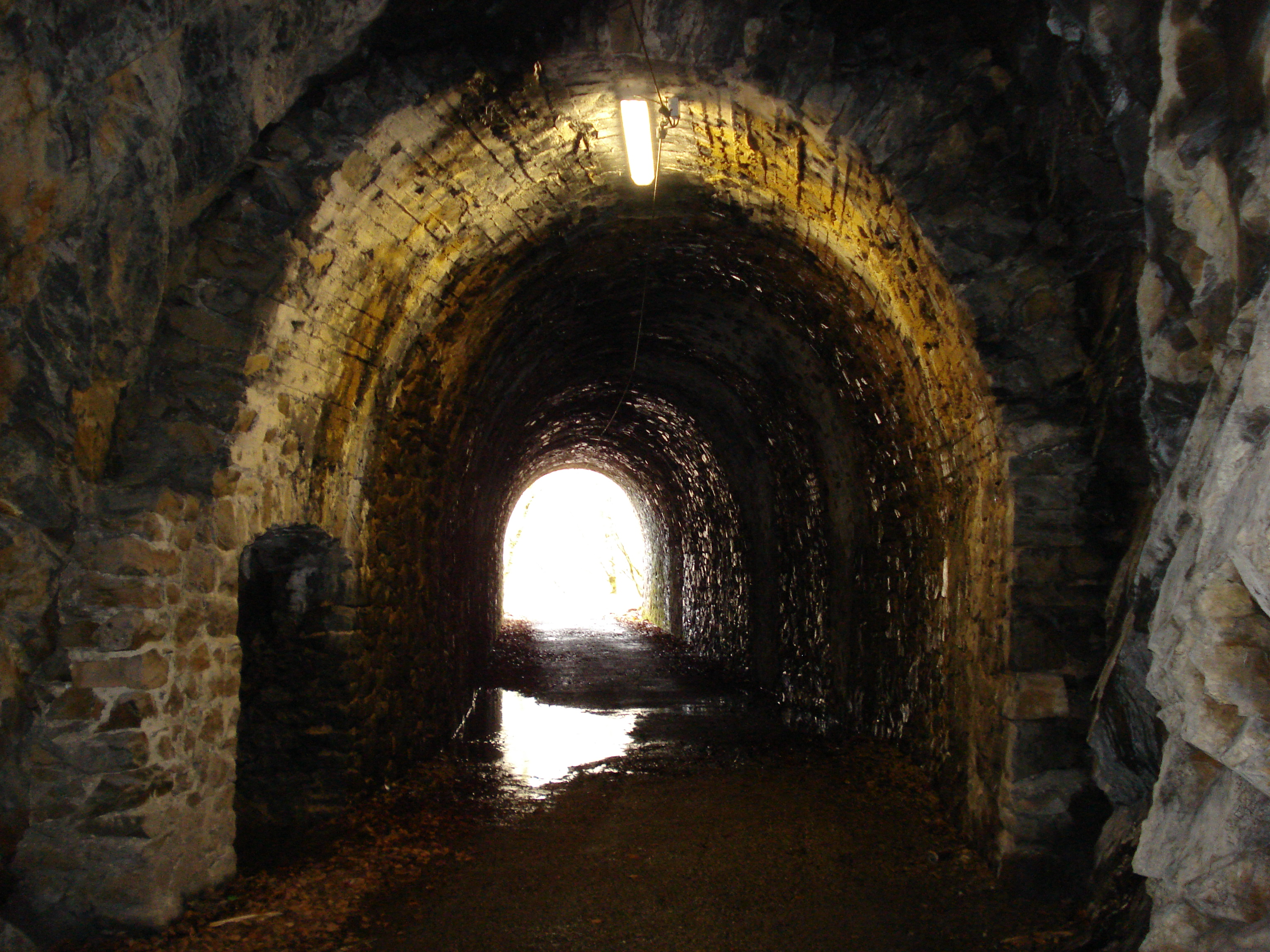
tunnel Soursac side.

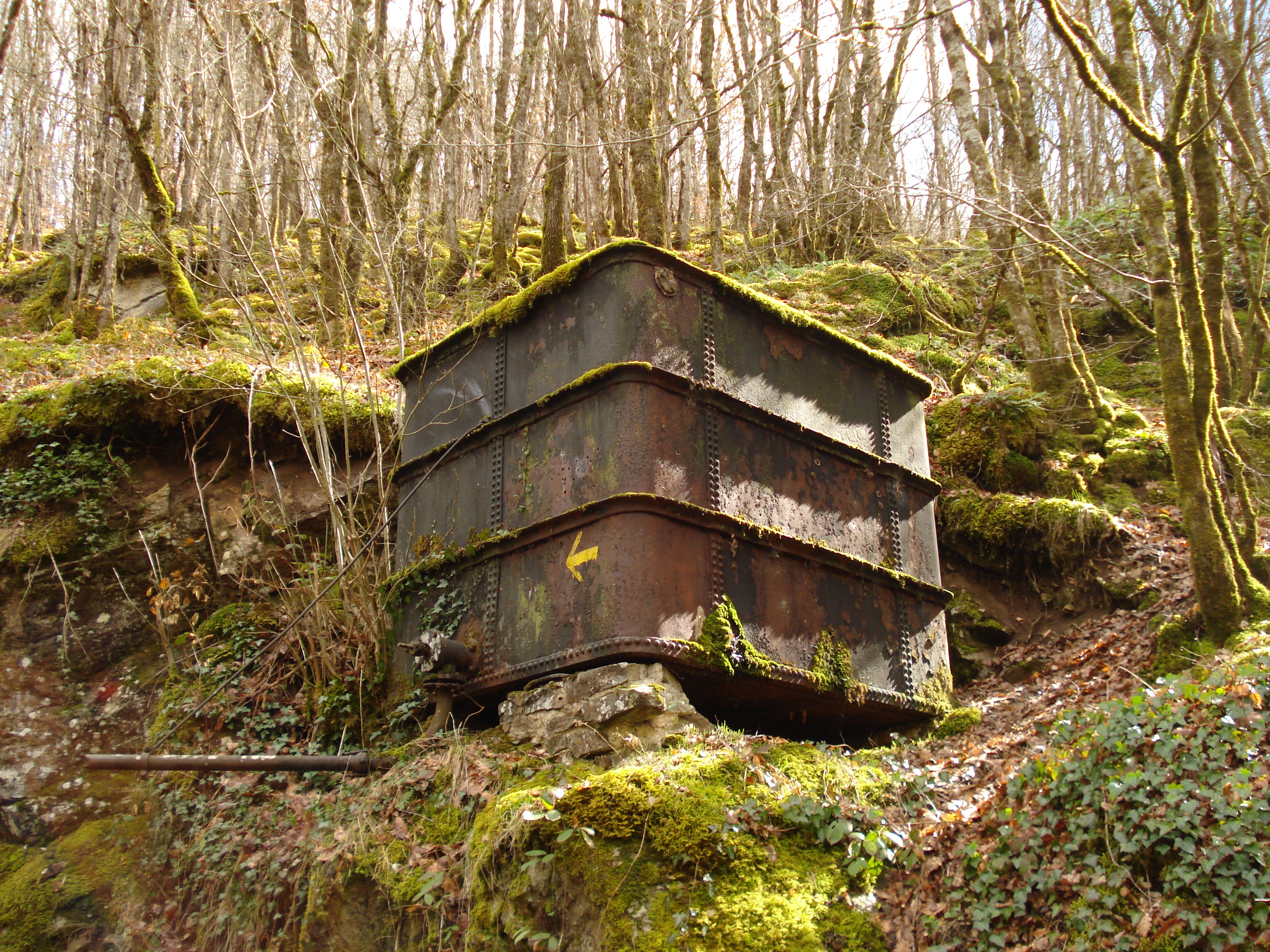
old water tank for steam locomotive Soursac side.

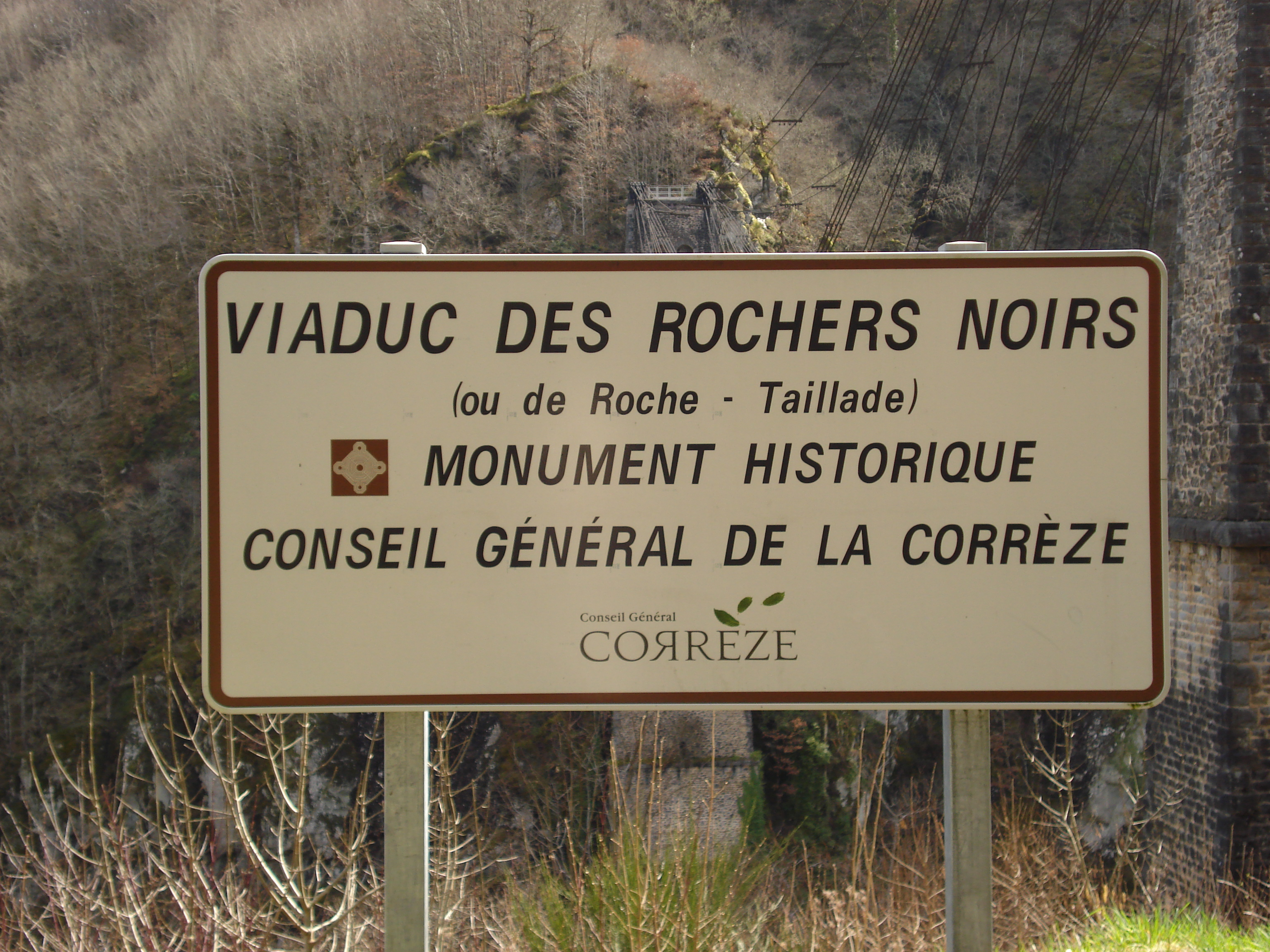

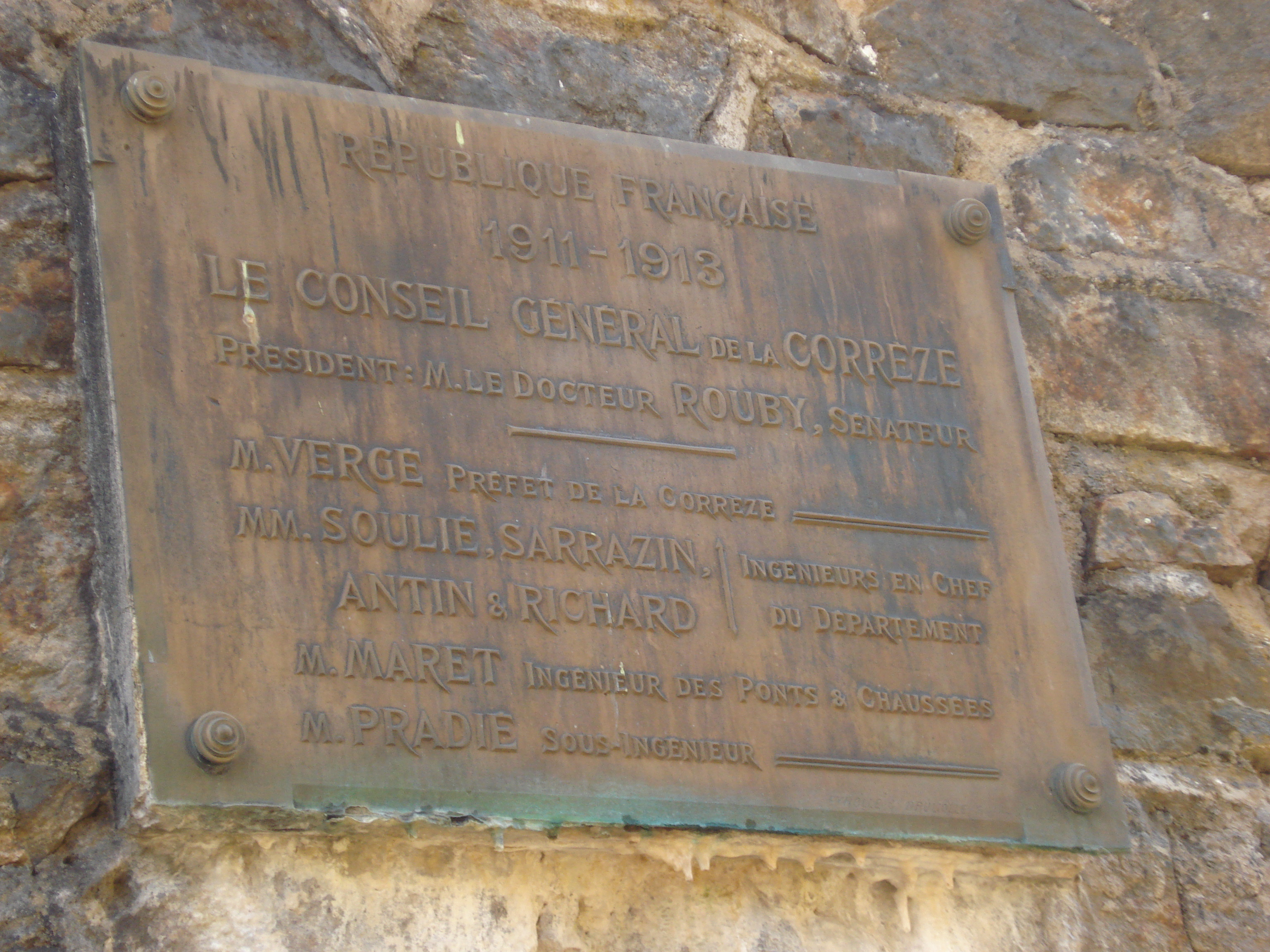

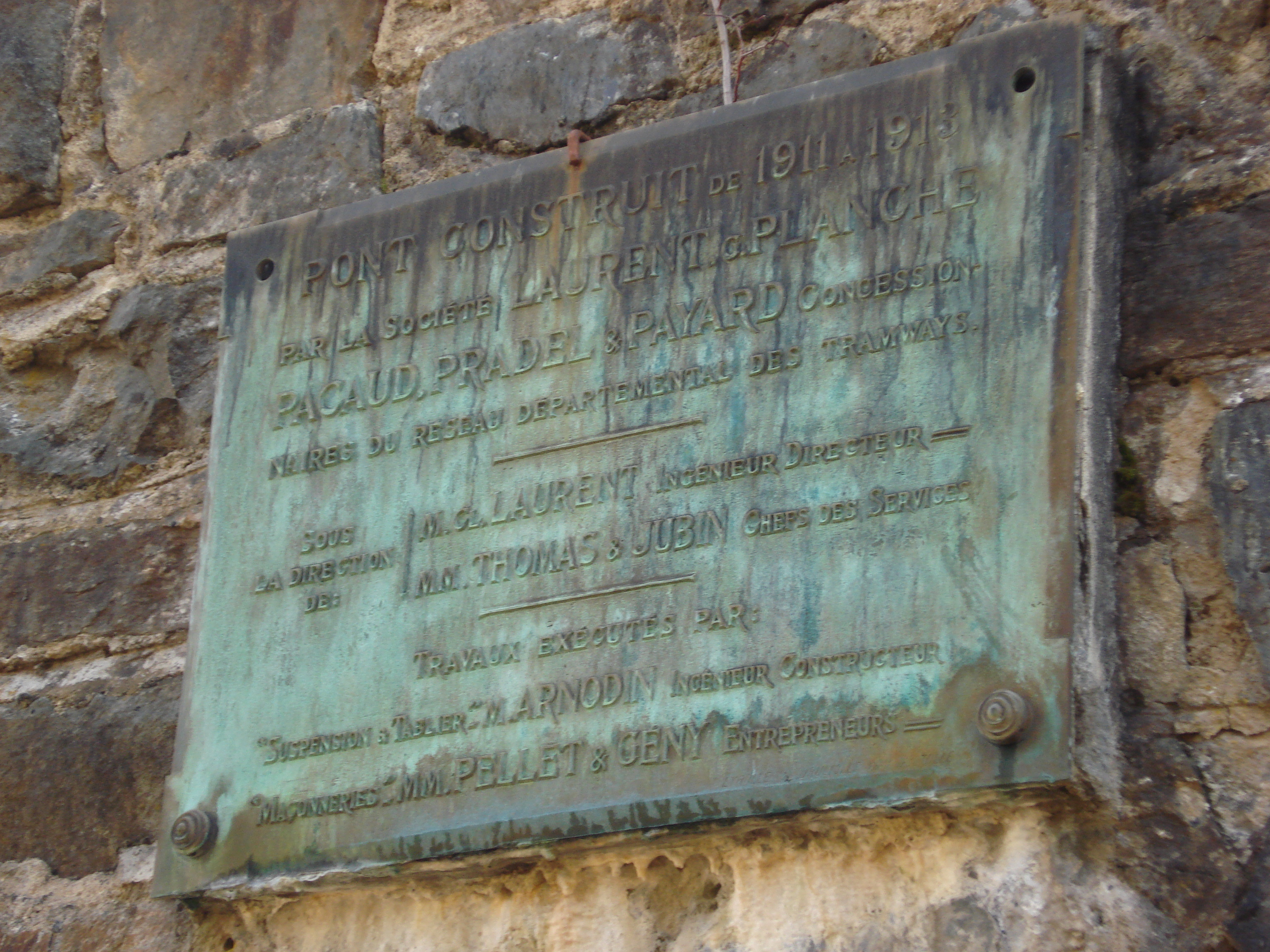
