= Rosiers-d'Égletons =

- Commune
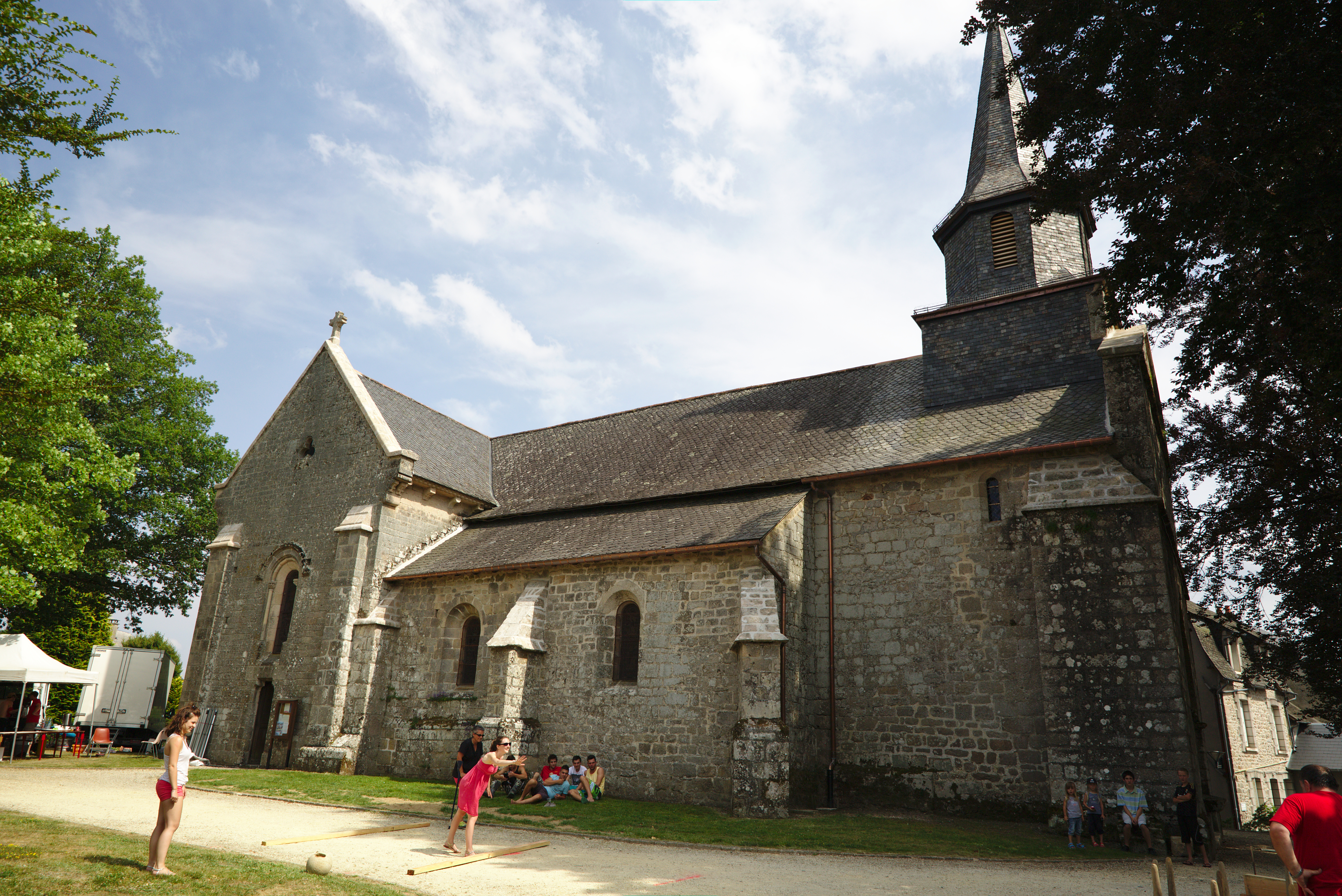
- Holy Cross Church in Rosiers-d'Égletons

- Coat of arms
- Location of Rosiers-d'Égletons
- Location within France Location within Nouvelle-Aquitaine
- Coordinates: 45°22′37″N 2°00′25″E
- Country: France
- Region: Nouvelle-Aquitaine
- Department: Corrèze
- Arrondissement: Ussel
- Canton: Égletons

Government
  - Mayor (2020–2026): Gérard Brette
- Area^{1}: 38.09 km^{2} (14.71 sq mi)
- Elevation: 590 m (1,940 ft)
- Population (2023): 1,083
  - Density: 28.43/km^{2} (73.64/sq mi)
- Time zone: UTC+01:00 (CET)
  - Summer (DST): UTC+02:00 (CEST)
- INSEE/Postal code: 19176 /19300
- ^{1} French Land Register data, which excludes lakes, ponds, glaciers > 1 km^{2} (0.386 sq mi or 247 acres) and river estuaries.

Rosiers-d'Égletons (French pronunciation: [ʁozje deɡlətɔ̃], literally Rosiers of Égletons; Occitan: Rosiers daus Gletons) is a commune in the Corrèze department in central France.

== Population ==
Historical population
Year	Pop.	±% p.a.
1968	912	—
1975	938	+0.40%
1982	1,011	+1.08%
1990	1,056	+0.55%
1999	1,018	−0.41%
2007	1,078	+0.72%
2012	1,057	−0.39%
2017	1,070	+0.24%
2023	1,083	+0.20%
Source: INSEE

== See also ==
- Communes of the Corrèze department
- Pope Gregory XI was born in Rosiers-d'Égletons c. 1329
