= Saint-Pantaléon-de-Lapleau =

- Commune
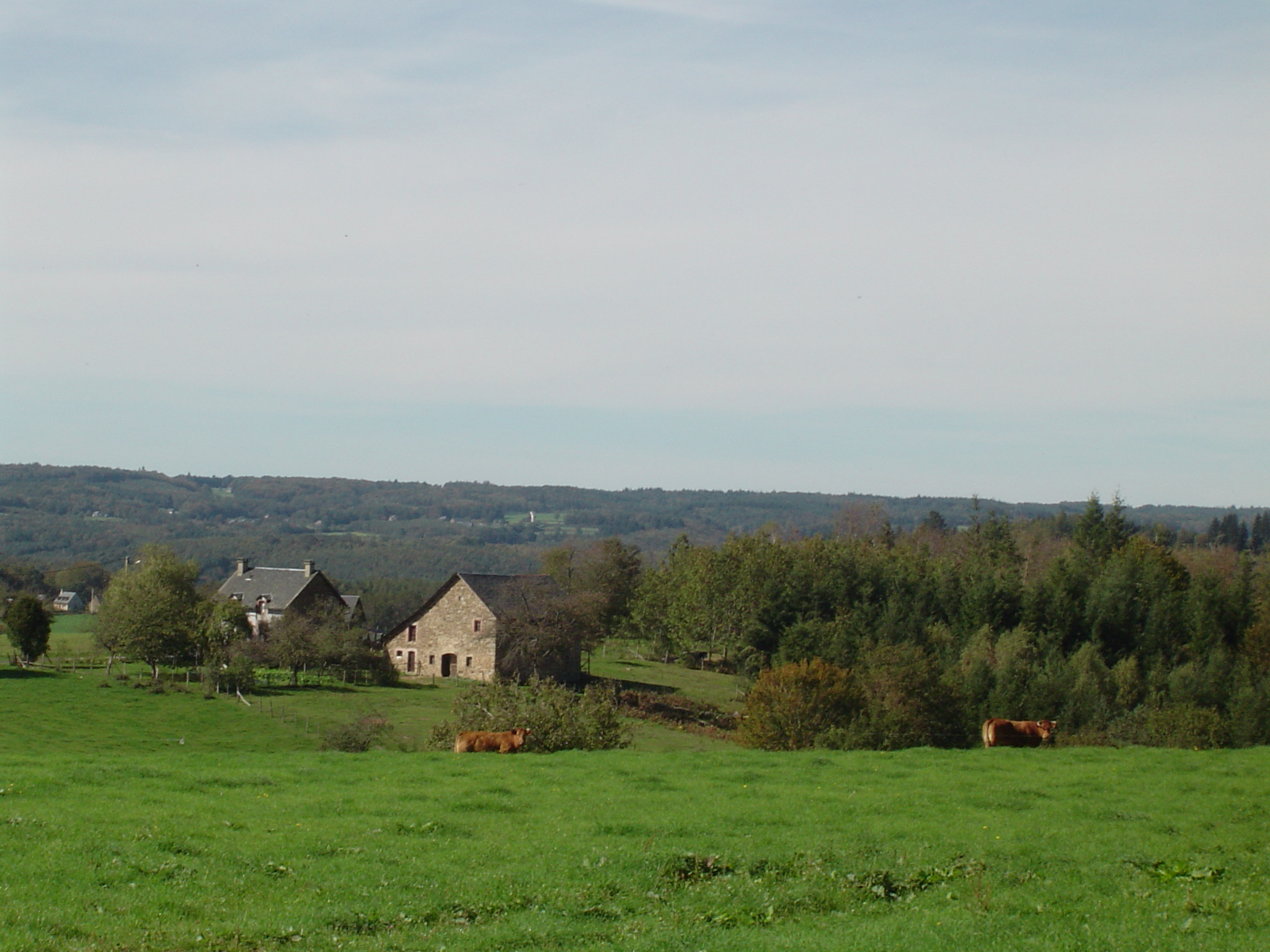
- A general view of Saint-Pantaléon-de-Lapleau

- Coat of arms
- Location of Saint-Pantaléon-de-Lapleau
- Location within France Location within Nouvelle-Aquitaine
- Coordinates: 45°19′26″N 2°12′20″E
- Country: France
- Region: Nouvelle-Aquitaine
- Department: Corrèze
- Arrondissement: Ussel
- Canton: Haute-Dordogne
- Intercommunality: Haute-Corrèze Communauté

Government
  - Mayor (2020–2026): Vincent Calonne
- Area^{1}: 8.46 km^{2} (3.27 sq mi)
- Elevation: 612 m (2,008 ft)
- Highest elevation: 609 m (1,998 ft)
- Lowest elevation: 332 m (1,089 ft)
- Population (2023): 63
  - Density: 7.4/km^{2} (19/sq mi)
- Time zone: UTC+01:00 (CET)
  - Summer (DST): UTC+02:00 (CEST)
- INSEE/Postal code: 19228 /19160
- ^{1} French Land Register data, which excludes lakes, ponds, glaciers > 1 km^{2} (0.386 sq mi or 247 acres) and river estuaries.

Saint-Pantaléon-de-Lapleau (French pronunciation: [sɛ̃ pɑ̃taleɔ̃ də laplo], literally Saint-Pantaléon of Lapleau; Occitan: Sent Pantaleon de la Pléu) is a commune in the Corrèze department in central France.

== Geography ==
The Luzège forms part of the commune's southwestern boundary.

== Population ==
Historical population
Year	Pop.	±% p.a.
1968	106	—
1975	80	−3.94%
1982	55	−5.21%
1990	65	+2.11%
1999	66	+0.17%
2007	68	+0.37%
2012	71	+0.87%
2017	67	−1.15%
2023	63	−1.02%
Source: INSEE

== See also ==
- Communes of the Corrèze department
