= Roland Bondonny =

French murderer

- Born: 12 May 1932; Meymac, France
- Died: 2 February 2005 (aged 72); France
- Cause of death: Suicide by hanging

Details
- Victims: 144 pets 1 human
- Span of crimes: 1997–2001
- Country: France
- Date apprehended: February 14, 2001

Roland Bondonny (12 May 1932 – 2 February 2005) was a wealthy vintner who lived in France, in Égletons in Corrèze and also in Fourmies in Nord. He poisoned 144 pets between 1997 and 2001. Bondonny had fed them meatballs contaminated with insecticide. He hired Alain Bodchon to kill Marius Lac, a witness for the prosecution in the case against Bondonny. Marius Lac's body was found dead in his garage, his body hidden under a wheelbarrow. on August 25, 2004. Shortly before he was to appear in court in February 2005, he hanged himself in his cell.
