= Vitrac-sur-Montane =

- Commune
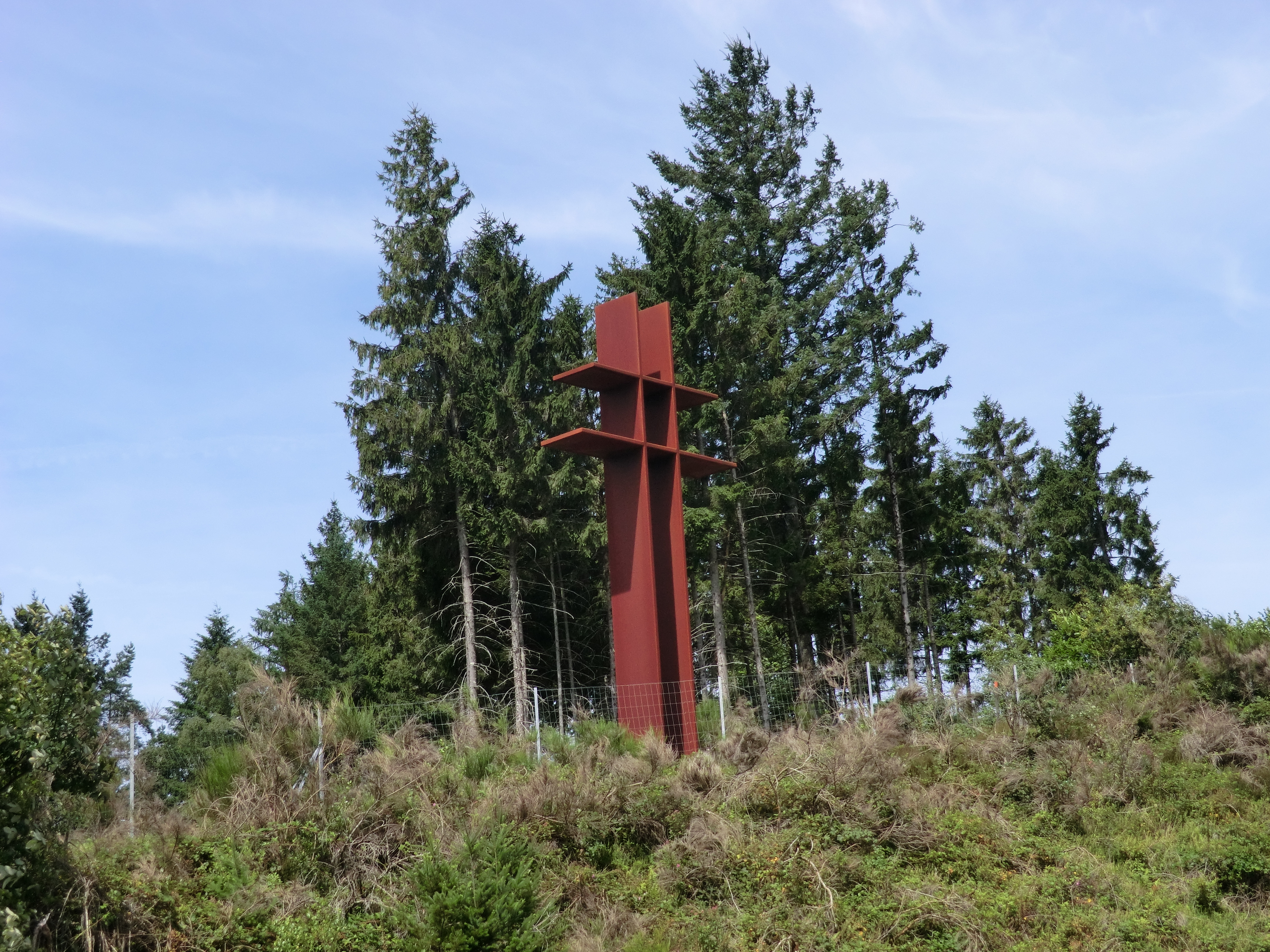
- Monument to the Resistance and the deportation

- Coat of arms
- Location of Vitrac-sur-Montane
- Location within France Location within Nouvelle-Aquitaine
- Coordinates: 45°22′39″N 1°56′13″E
- Country: France
- Region: Nouvelle-Aquitaine
- Department: Corrèze
- Arrondissement: Tulle
- Canton: Égletons
- Intercommunality: CA Tulle Agglo

Government
  - Mayor (2020–2026): Valérie Dumas
- Area^{1}: 27.24 km^{2} (10.52 sq mi)
- Highest elevation: 661 m (2,169 ft)
- Lowest elevation: 470 m (1,540 ft)
- Population (2023): 222
  - Density: 8.15/km^{2} (21.1/sq mi)
- Time zone: UTC+01:00 (CET)
  - Summer (DST): UTC+02:00 (CEST)
- INSEE/Postal code: 19287 /19800
- ^{1} French Land Register data, which excludes lakes, ponds, glaciers > 1 km^{2} (0.386 sq mi or 247 acres) and river estuaries.

Vitrac-sur-Montane (French pronunciation: [vitʁak syʁ mɔ̃tan]; Occitan: Vitrac de Montana) is a commune in the Corrèze department in central France.

== Population ==
Historical population
Year	Pop.	±% p.a.
1968	303	—
1975	286	−0.82%
1982	239	−2.53%
1990	244	+0.26%
1999	214	−1.45%
2007	252	+2.06%
2012	252	+0.00%
2017	267	+1.16%
2023	222	−3.03%
Source: INSEE

== See also ==
- Communes of the Corrèze department
