= Canton of Égletons =

Coordinates: 45.41°N 2.05°E

The canton of Égletons is an administrative division of the Corrèze department, south-central France. Its borders were modified at the French canton reorganisation which came into effect in March 2015. Its seat is in Égletons.

It consists of the following communes:

1. Champagnac-la-Noaille
2. Chapelle-Spinasse
3. Chaumeil
4. Égletons
5. Lafage-sur-Sombre
6. Lapleau
7. Laval-sur-Luzège
8. Marcillac-la-Croisille
9. Montaignac-sur-Doustre
10. Moustier-Ventadour
11. Rosiers-d'Égletons
12. Saint-Hilaire-Foissac
13. Saint-Merd-de-Lapleau
14. Saint-Yrieix-le-Déjalat
15. Sarran
16. Soursac
17. Vitrac-sur-Montane
