= Lafage-sur-Sombre =

- Commune
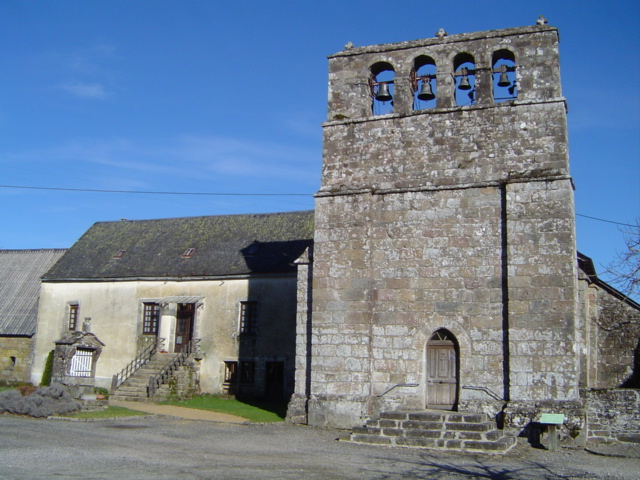
- The church and presbytery in Lafage-sur-Sombre

- Coat of arms
- Location of Lafage-sur-Sombre
- Location within France Location within Nouvelle-Aquitaine
- Coordinates: 45°17′47″N 2°04′19″E
- Country: France
- Region: Nouvelle-Aquitaine
- Department: Corrèze
- Arrondissement: Ussel
- Canton: Égletons

Government
  - Mayor (2025–2026): Claude Bardot
- Area^{1}: 18.94 km^{2} (7.31 sq mi)
- Highest elevation: 686 m (2,251 ft)
- Lowest elevation: 493 m (1,617 ft)
- Population (2023): 137
  - Density: 7.23/km^{2} (18.7/sq mi)
- Time zone: UTC+01:00 (CET)
  - Summer (DST): UTC+02:00 (CEST)
- INSEE/Postal code: 19097 /19320
- ^{1} French Land Register data, which excludes lakes, ponds, glaciers > 1 km^{2} (0.386 sq mi or 247 acres) and river estuaries.

Lafage-sur-Sombre (French pronunciation: [lafaʒ syʁ sɔ̃bʁ]; Occitan: La Faja sus Fosc) is a commune in the Corrèze department in central France.

== Population ==
Historical population
Year	Pop.	±% p.a.
1968	207	—
1975	158	−3.79%
1982	162	+0.36%
1990	159	−0.23%
1999	116	−3.44%
2007	121	+0.53%
2012	117	−0.67%
2017	124	+1.17%
2023	137	+1.68%
Source: INSEE

== See also ==
- Communes of the Corrèze department
