= Lamazière-Basse =

- Commune
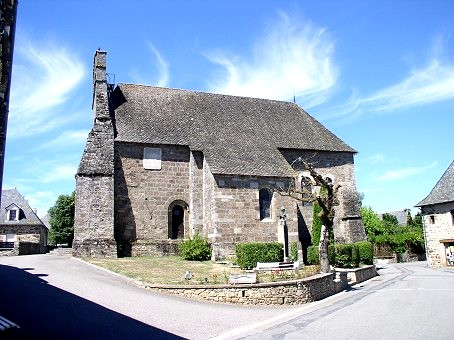
- The church in Lamazière-Basse

- Coat of arms
- Location of Lamazière-Basse
- Location within France Location within Nouvelle-Aquitaine
- Coordinates: 45°22′24″N 2°10′17″E
- Country: France
- Region: Nouvelle-Aquitaine
- Department: Corrèze
- Arrondissement: Ussel
- Canton: Haute-Dordogne
- Intercommunality: Haute-Corrèze Communauté

Government
  - Mayor (2020–2026): Jean-Pierre Delbègue
- Area^{1}: 44.04 km^{2} (17.00 sq mi)
- Highest elevation: 648 m (2,126 ft)
- Lowest elevation: 345 m (1,132 ft)
- Population (2023): 281
  - Density: 6.38/km^{2} (16.5/sq mi)
- Time zone: UTC+01:00 (CET)
  - Summer (DST): UTC+02:00 (CEST)
- INSEE/Postal code: 19102 /19160
- ^{1} French Land Register data, which excludes lakes, ponds, glaciers > 1 km^{2} (0.386 sq mi or 247 acres) and river estuaries.

Lamazière-Basse (French pronunciation: [lamazjɛʁ bas]; Occitan: La Masiera Bassa) is a commune in the Corrèze department in central France.

== Geography ==
The Vianon forms most of the commune's eastern and southeastern boundaries, then flows into the Luzège, which forms most of the commune's western and southwestern boundaries.

== Population ==
Historical population
Year	Pop.	±% p.a.
1968	422	—
1975	355	−2.44%
1982	350	−0.20%
1990	326	−0.88%
1999	286	−1.44%
2007	276	−0.44%
2012	301	+1.75%
2017	299	−0.13%
2023	281	−1.03%
Source: INSEE

== See also ==
- Communes of the Corrèze department
