= Chapelle-Spinasse =

- Commune
- Coat of arms
- Location of Chapelle-Spinasse
- Location within France Location within Nouvelle-Aquitaine
- Coordinates: 45°21′34″N 2°02′33″E
- Country: France
- Region: Nouvelle-Aquitaine
- Department: Corrèze
- Arrondissement: Ussel
- Canton: Égletons

Government
  - Mayor (2020–2026): Jean-Pierre Août
- Area^{1}: 5.89 km^{2} (2.27 sq mi)
- Elevation: 600 m (2,000 ft)
- Highest elevation: 645 m (2,116 ft)
- Lowest elevation: 564 m (1,850 ft)
- Population (2023): 114
  - Density: 19.4/km^{2} (50.1/sq mi)
- Time zone: UTC+01:00 (CET)
  - Summer (DST): UTC+02:00 (CEST)
- INSEE/Postal code: 19046 /19300
- ^{1} French Land Register data, which excludes lakes, ponds, glaciers > 1 km^{2} (0.386 sq mi or 247 acres) and river estuaries.

Chapelle-Spinasse (French pronunciation: [ʃapɛl spinas]; Occitan: Chapela Espinassa) is a commune in the Corrèze department in central France.

== Population ==
Historical population
Year	Pop.	±% p.a.
1968	124	—
1975	134	+1.11%
1982	119	−1.68%
1990	137	+1.78%
1999	133	−0.33%
2007	113	−2.02%
2012	115	+0.35%
2017	115	+0.00%
2023	114	−0.15%
Source: INSEE

== See also ==
- Communes of the Corrèze department
