= Champagnac-la-Noaille =

- Commune
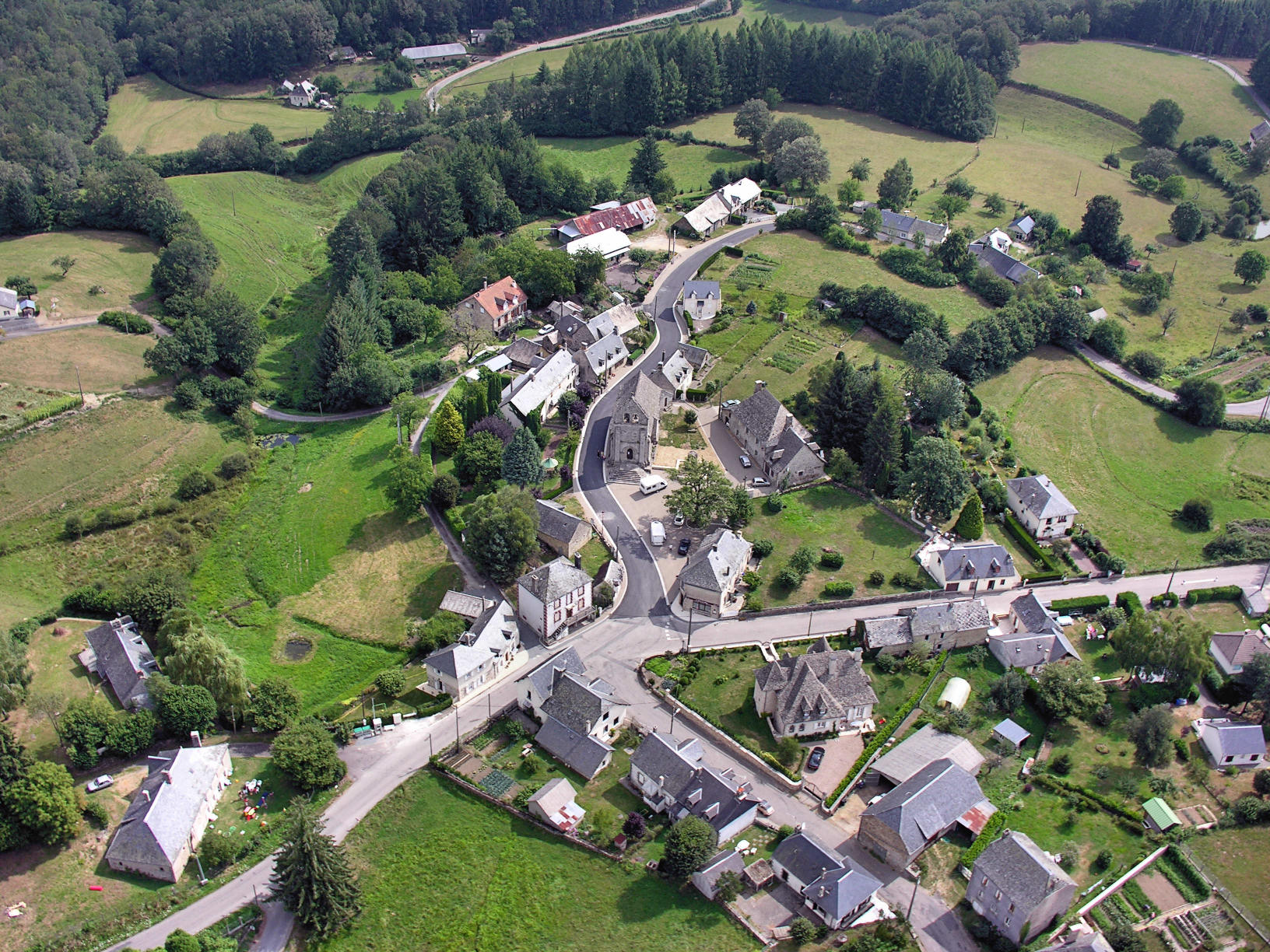
- An aerial view of Champagnac-la-Noaille

- Coat of arms
- Location of Champagnac-la-Noaille
- Location within France Location within Nouvelle-Aquitaine
- Coordinates: 45°18′28″N 2°01′00″E
- Country: France
- Region: Nouvelle-Aquitaine
- Department: Corrèze
- Arrondissement: Ussel
- Canton: Égletons

Government
  - Mayor (2026–32): Jean-Pierre Valadour
- Area^{1}: 25.47 km^{2} (9.83 sq mi)
- Elevation: 560 m (1,840 ft)
- Highest elevation: 630 m (2,070 ft)
- Lowest elevation: 492 m (1,614 ft)
- Population (2023): 237
  - Density: 9.31/km^{2} (24.1/sq mi)
- Demonym: Champagnacois
- Time zone: UTC+01:00 (CET)
  - Summer (DST): UTC+02:00 (CEST)
- INSEE/Postal code: 19039 /19320
- ^{1} French Land Register data, which excludes lakes, ponds, glaciers > 1 km^{2} (0.386 sq mi or 247 acres) and river estuaries.

Champagnac-la-Noaille (French pronunciation: [ʃɑ̃paɲak la nɔaj]; Occitan: Champanhac la Noalha) is a commune in the Corrèze department in central France.

== Population ==
Historical population
Year	Pop.	±% p.a.
1968	315	—
1975	293	−1.03%
1982	258	−1.80%
1990	221	−1.92%
1999	190	−1.67%
2007	218	+1.73%
2012	233	+1.34%
2017	233	+0.00%
2023	237	+0.28%
Source: INSEE

== Local culture and heritage ==
=== Places and monuments ===
- Church Saint-Martin de Champagnac-la-Noaille

== See also ==
- Communes of the Corrèze department
