= Laval-sur-Luzège =

- Commune
- Coat of arms
- Location of Laval-sur-Luzège
- Location within France Location within Nouvelle-Aquitaine
- Coordinates: 45°16′04″N 2°08′04″E
- Country: France
- Region: Nouvelle-Aquitaine
- Department: Corrèze
- Arrondissement: Ussel
- Canton: Égletons

Government
  - Mayor (2020–2026): Jean-Noël Lanoir
- Area^{1}: 16.94 km^{2} (6.54 sq mi)
- Elevation: 532 m (1,745 ft)
- Highest elevation: 560 m (1,840 ft)
- Lowest elevation: 260 m (850 ft)
- Population (2023): 103
  - Density: 6.08/km^{2} (15.7/sq mi)
- Time zone: UTC+01:00 (CET)
  - Summer (DST): UTC+02:00 (CEST)
- INSEE/Postal code: 19111 /19550
- ^{1} French Land Register data, which excludes lakes, ponds, glaciers > 1 km^{2} (0.386 sq mi or 247 acres) and river estuaries.

Laval-sur-Luzège (French pronunciation: [laval syʁ lyzɛʒ], literally Laval on Luzège; Occitan: La Val) is a commune in the Corrèze department in central France.

== Geography ==
The Luzège forms the commune's eastern boundary, then flows into the Dordogne, which forms the commune's southern boundary.

== Population ==
Historical population
Year	Pop.	±% p.a.
1968	190	—
1975	161	−2.34%
1982	126	−3.44%
1990	96	−3.34%
1999	87	−1.09%
2007	91	+0.56%
2012	102	+2.31%
2017	99	−0.60%
2023	103	+0.66%
Source: INSEE

== See also ==
- Communes of the Corrèze department
