= Maussac =

- Commune
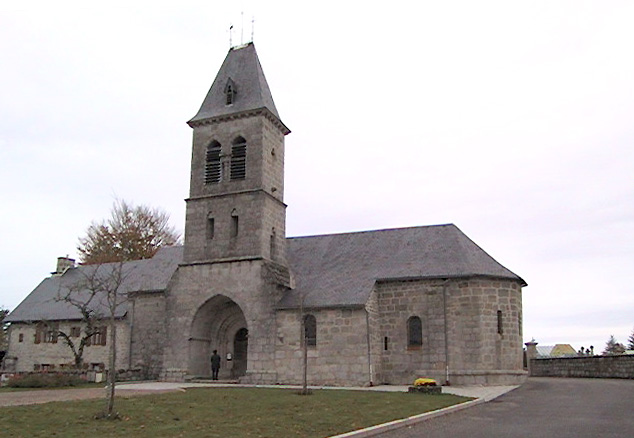
- The church in Maussac

- Coat of arms
- Location of Maussac
- Location within France Location within Nouvelle-Aquitaine
- Coordinates: 45°28′23″N 2°08′38″E
- Country: France
- Region: Nouvelle-Aquitaine
- Department: Corrèze
- Arrondissement: Ussel
- Canton: Plateau de Millevaches
- Intercommunality: Haute-Corrèze Communauté

Government
  - Mayor (2026–2032): Laurence Mocaër
- Area^{1}: 13.78 km^{2} (5.32 sq mi)
- Highest elevation: 685 m (2,247 ft)
- Lowest elevation: 555 m (1,821 ft)
- Population (2023): 452
  - Density: 32.8/km^{2} (85.0/sq mi)
- Time zone: UTC+01:00 (CET)
  - Summer (DST): UTC+02:00 (CEST)
- INSEE/Postal code: 19130 /19250
- ^{1} French Land Register data, which excludes lakes, ponds, glaciers > 1 km^{2} (0.386 sq mi or 247 acres) and river estuaries.

Maussac (French pronunciation: [mosak]) is a commune in the Corrèze department in central France.

== History ==
=== Iron Age period ===
A tumulus marks the junction point of the communes of Maussac, Meymac, and Davignac.

Near the hamlet of La Forêt, several piles of stones show collapsed structures. The site delivered a polished axe. Some shards of common, unturned pottery may date from the end of the Second Iron Age or even from the time of Augustus. Slag, associated with ceramic crucible bottoms, relates to metallurgical activity.

=== Gallo-Roman period ===
Several Gallo-Roman sites are known in the commune.

The Roman road Clermont-Périgueux passed the Luzège south of the Chaussades, then headed towards the Bole-Grande via the Marteaux.

An old road coming from Ussel headed towards Saint-Yrieix-le-Déjalat via the Sirieix.

In the village, ancient remains have been reported near the church. They mark the location of a Gallo-Roman structure, perhaps a sanctuary.

To the west of Lapleau station, tegulæ and fragments of common and sigillata pottery indicate the presence of a Gallo-Roman construction.

Near the hamlet of Les Marteaux, the presence of tegulæ corresponds to the location of an ancient structure.

Not far from there, 200 m west of the Varaze farm, a cremation burial in a funerary chest was uncovered at the end of 1965. The base and its lid were not assembled by a ridge and rebate system as is generally the case. The coarse funerary chest, quadrangular in shape, contained a glass cinerary urn equipped with two massive handles shaped like an M., broken during discovery.

A tiny gold plate (1sqcm) was found among the ashes and bone fragments, likely replacing the traditional coin (Charon's obol) intended to pay for crossing the river of the Underworld. Ceramic furniture was practically nonexistent.

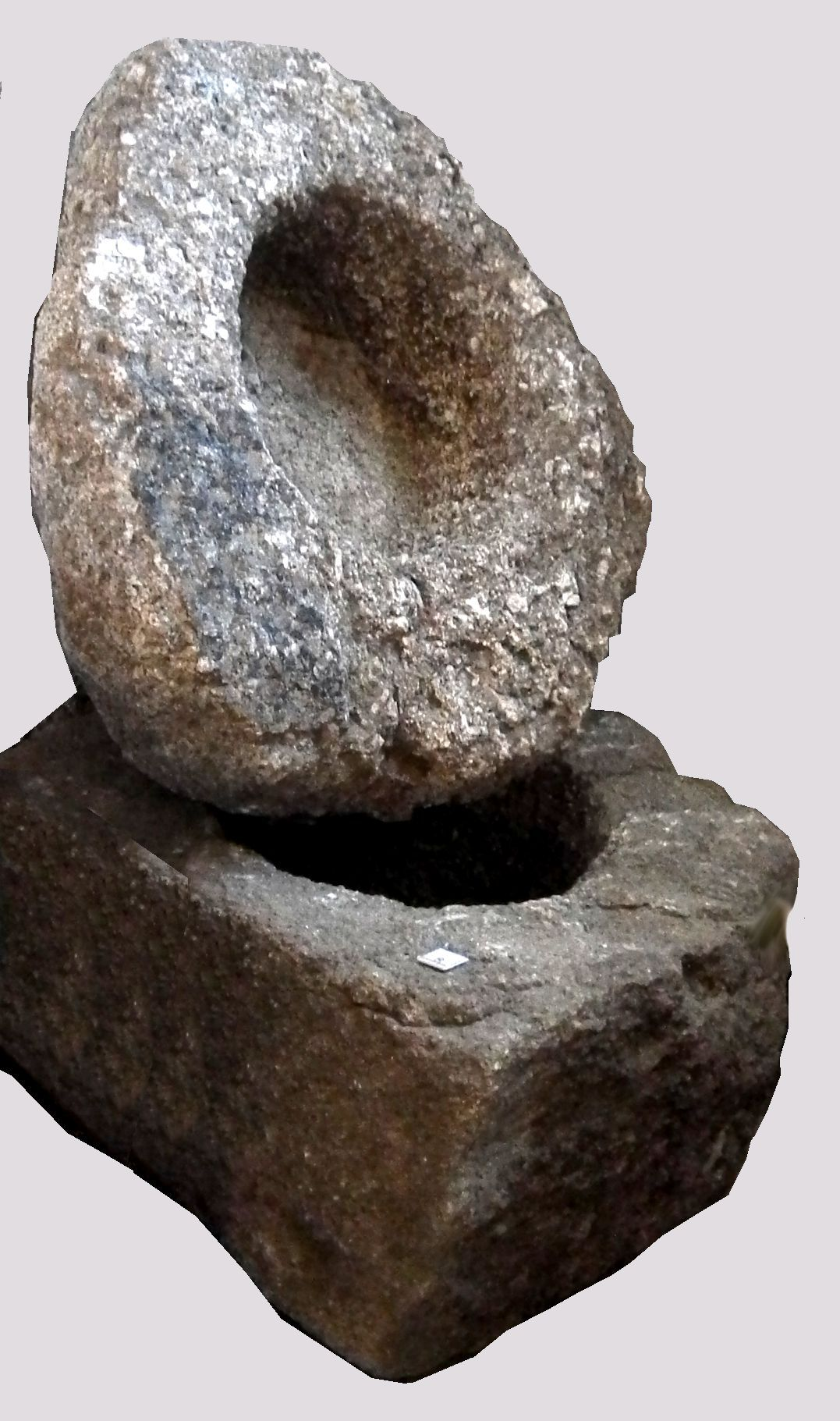
Funeral chest of Les Marteaux.

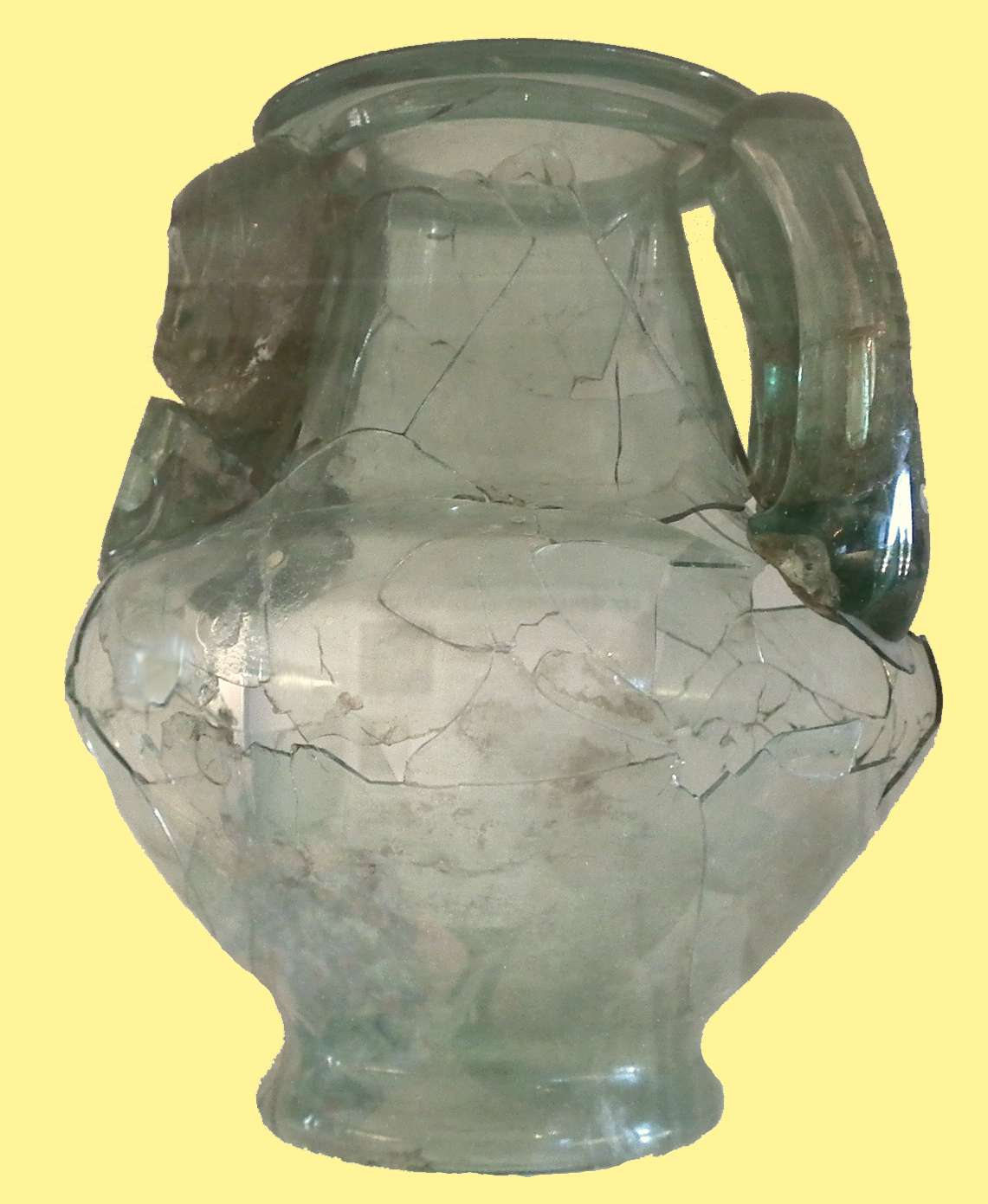
Funerary urn with two M-handles.

== Geography ==
The Luzège forms the commune's eastern boundary.

== Population ==
Historical population
Year	Pop.	±% p.a.
1968	513	—
1975	483	−0.86%
1982	461	−0.66%
1990	397	−1.85%
1999	385	−0.34%
2007	391	+0.19%
2012	416	+1.25%
2017	439	+1.08%
2023	452	+0.49%
Source: INSEE

== Culture and heritage ==
=== Places and monuments ===
- Small Église Paroissiale Saint-Christophe de Maussac - It is listed in the General Inventory of Cultural Heritage. Originally belonging to the Bonnesaigne priory with parts from the 12th-century, altered in the 15th-century and restored in the 19th-century:
  - bell tower on the south side of the nave established in 1880;
  - original cover in thick Allassac slates. According to the municipality, these slates were removed a few years ago from the Bity castle in Sarran and were replaced by small ordinary mechanical slates.
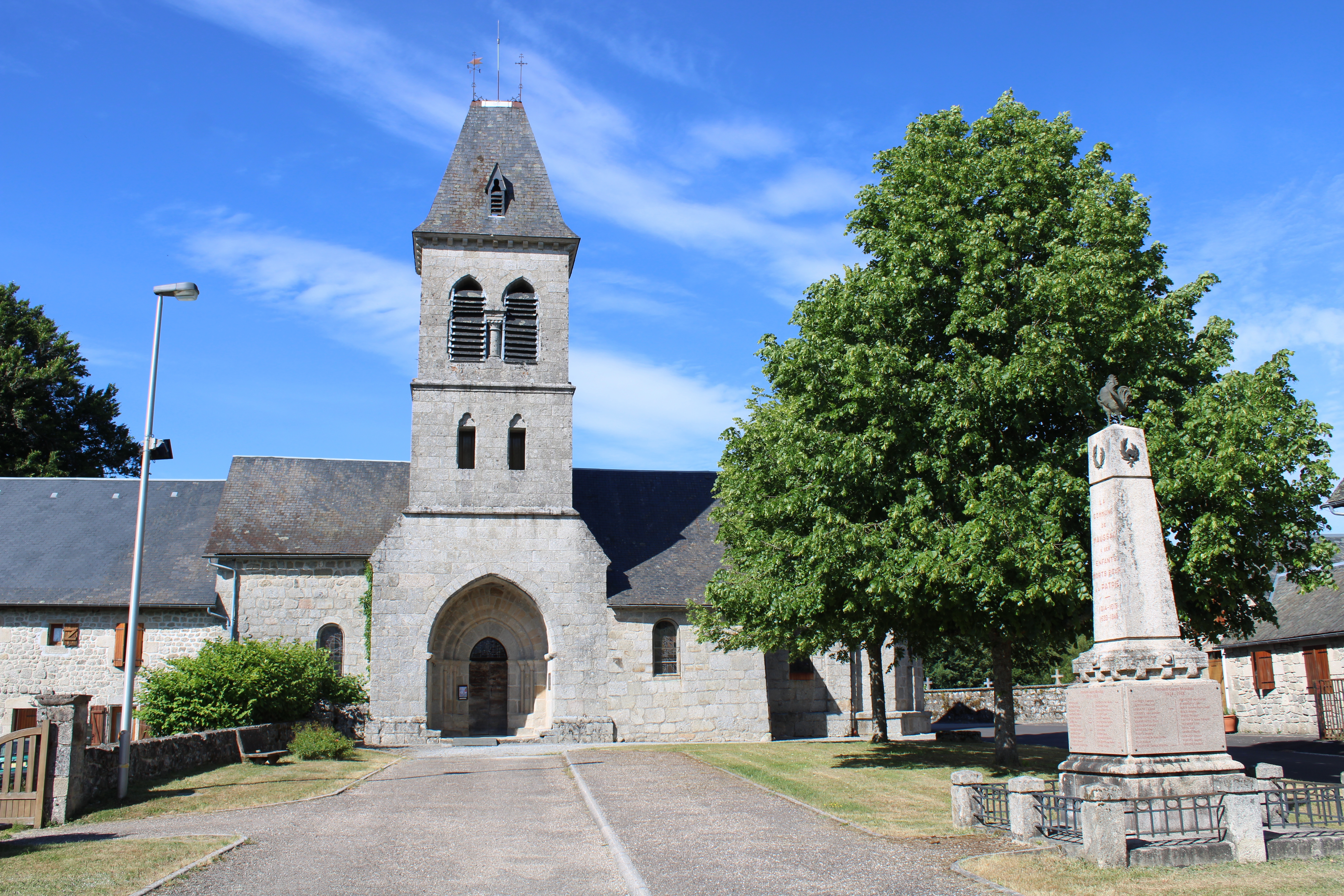
The village square.

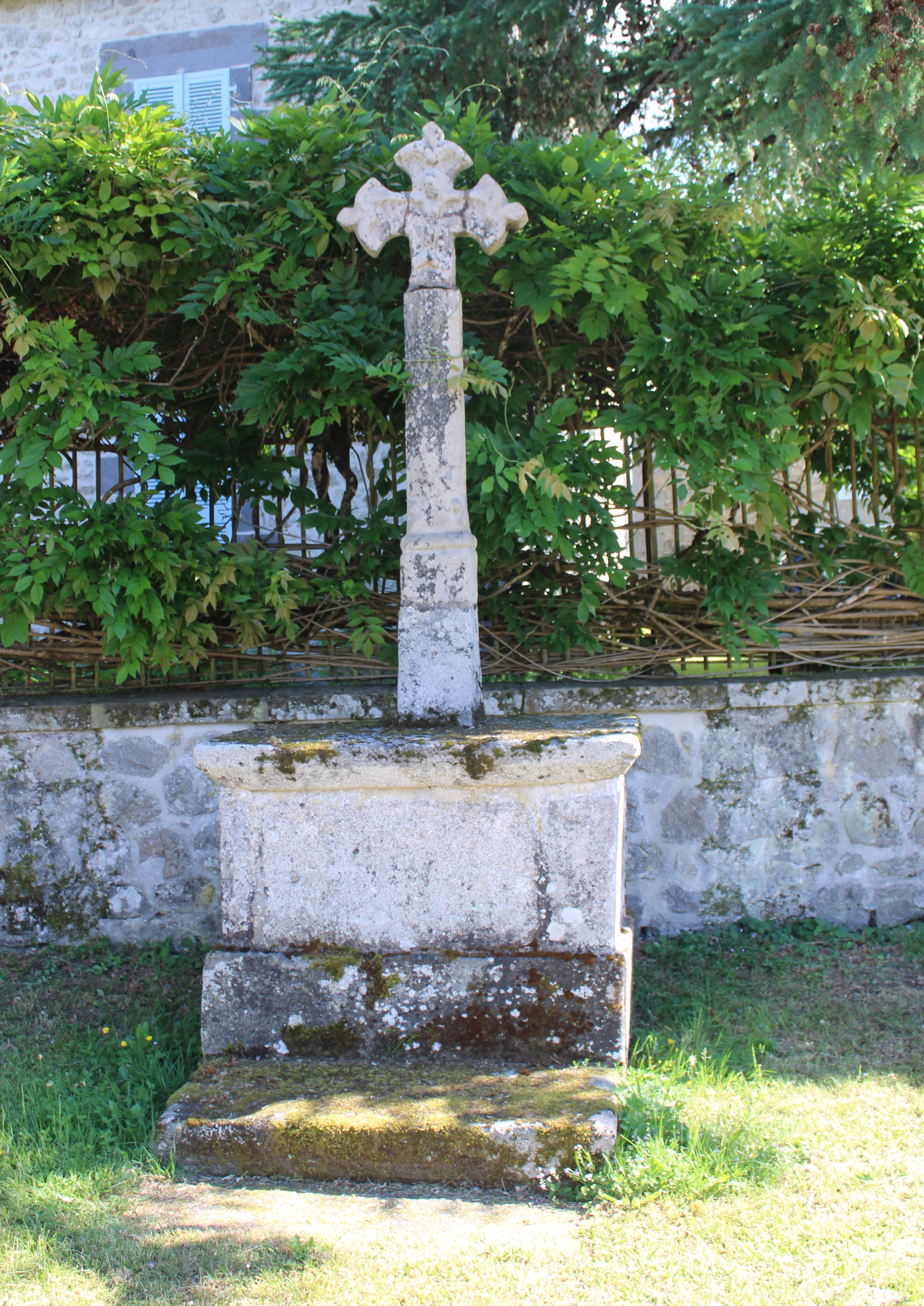
Former calvary cross.

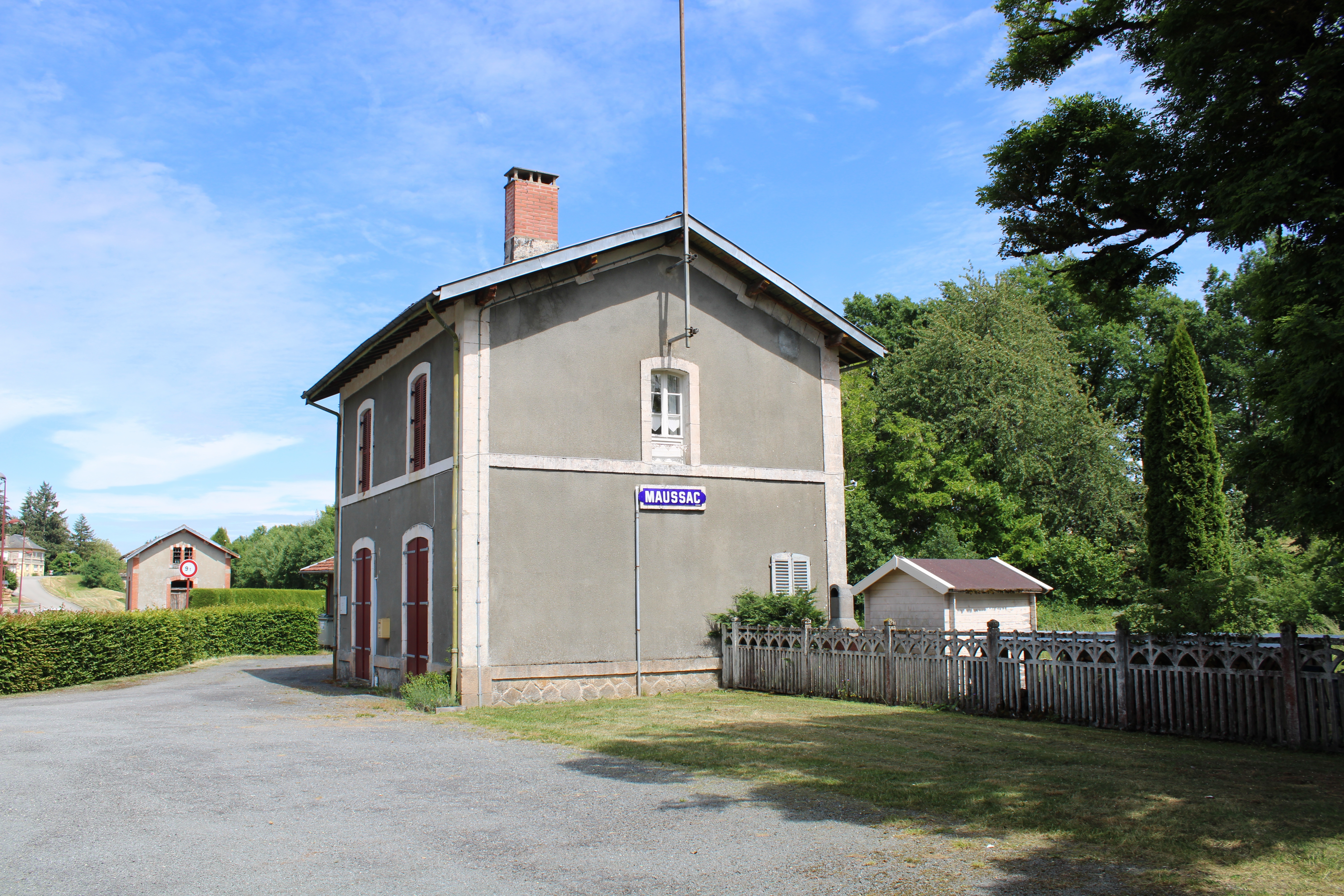
The former Maussac station.

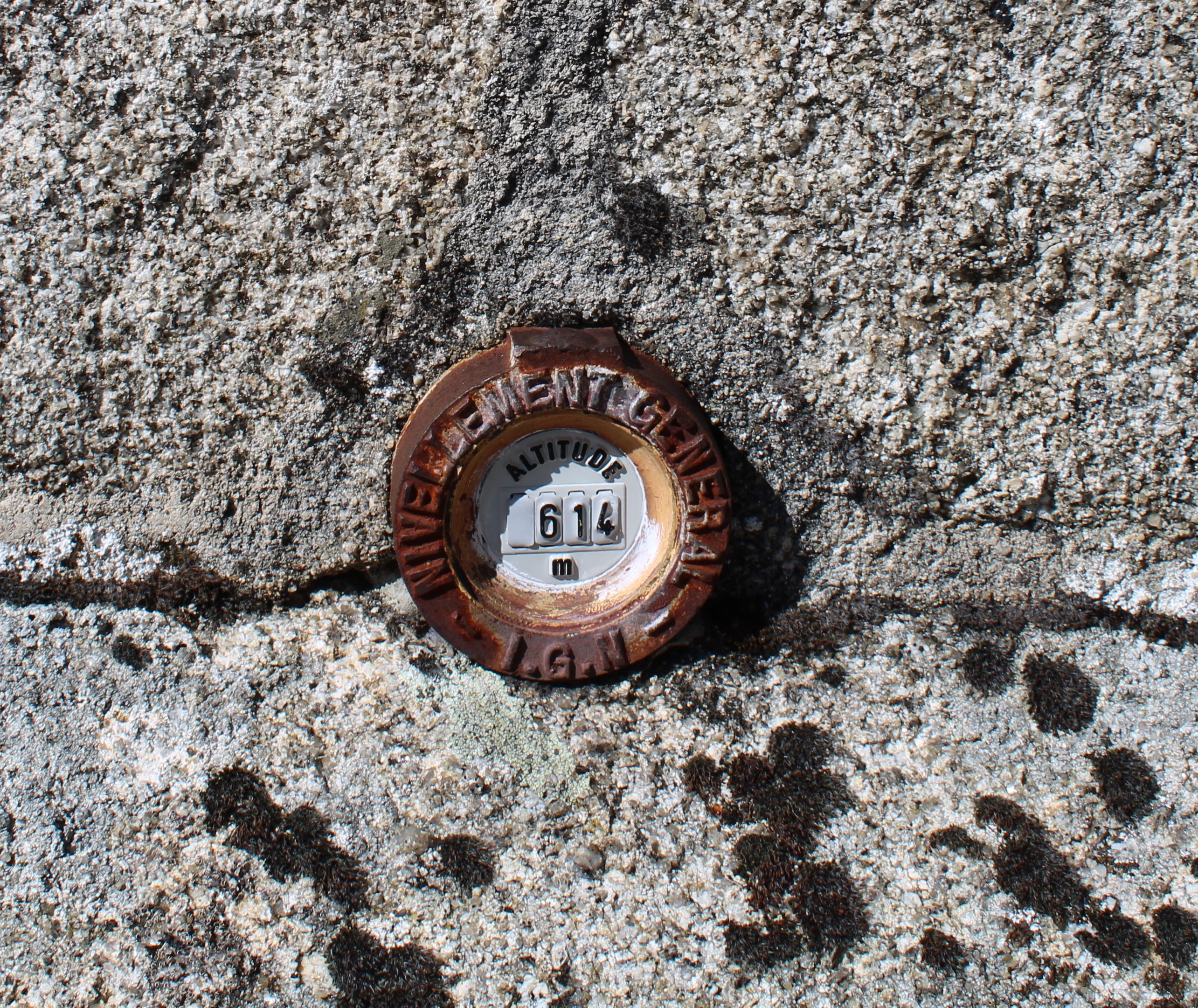
The leveling marker fixed on the church wall indicates that the site is located at an altitude of 614 m.

== See also ==
- Communes of the Corrèze department
