= Luzège =

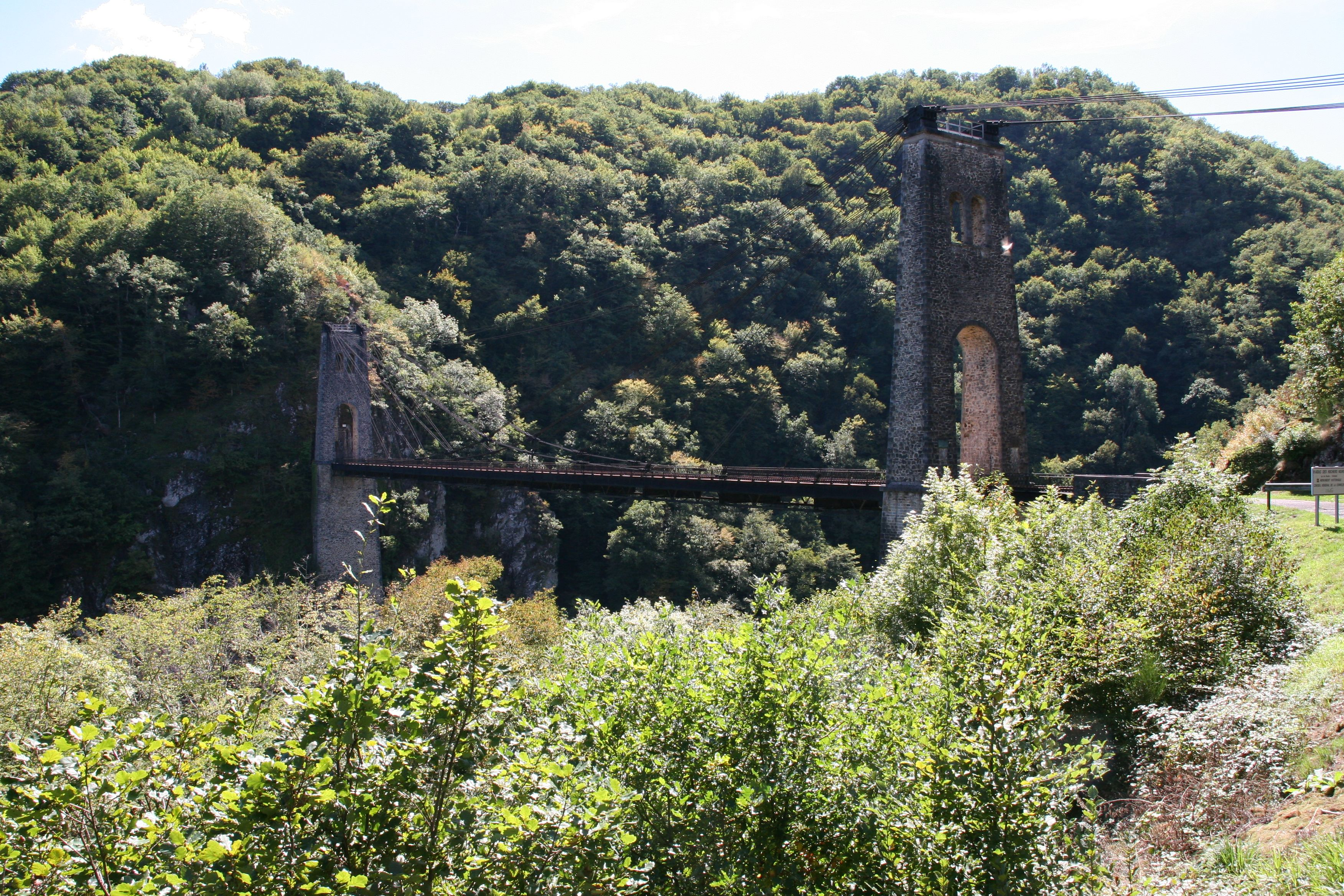

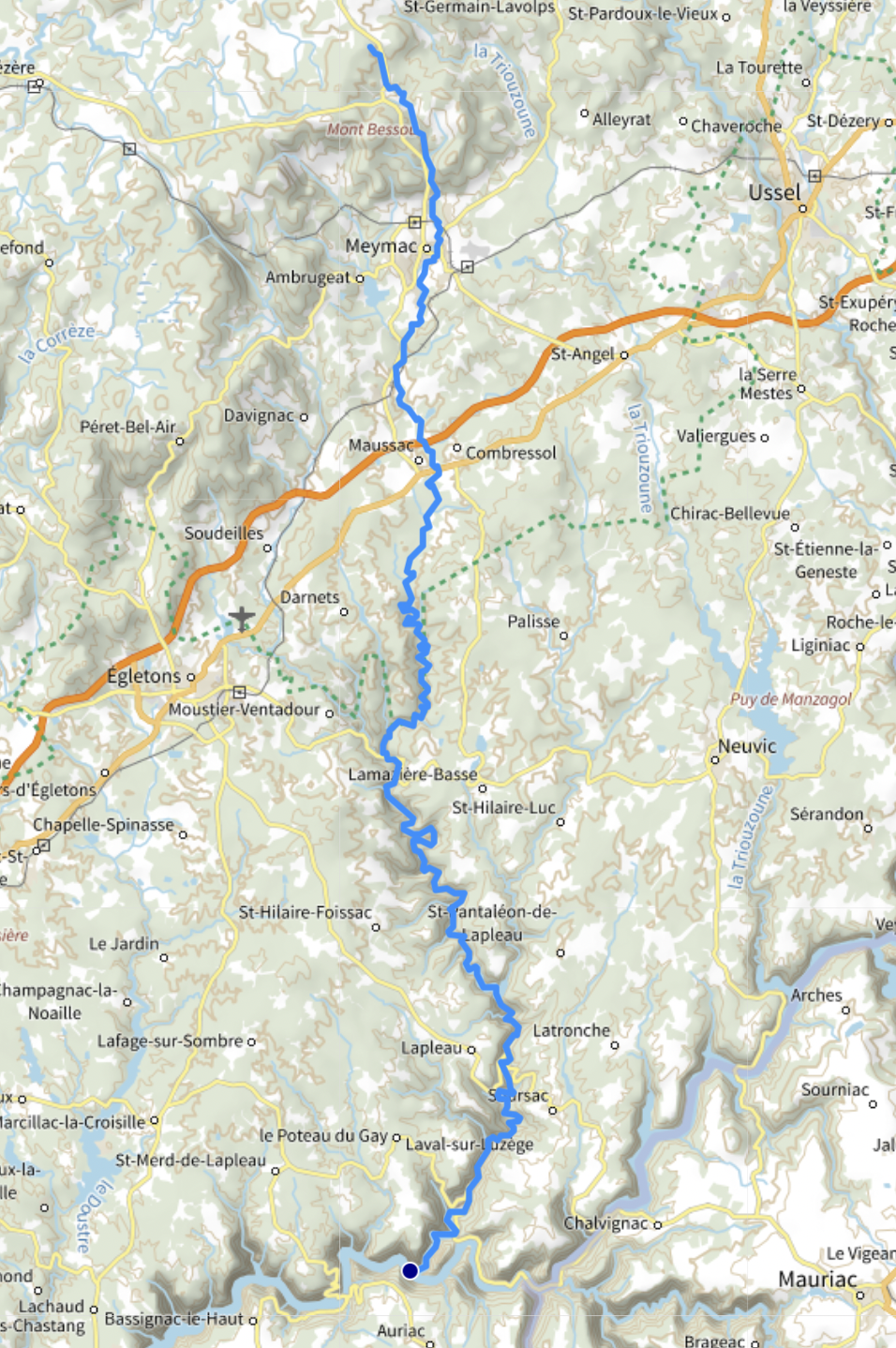

Location
- Country: France

Physical characteristics
- Source
  - location: Meymac
  - coordinates: 45°35′37″N 02°06′53″E
  - elevation: 925 m (3,035 ft)
- Mouth
  - location: Dordogne
  - coordinates: 45°13′36″N 02°08′25″E
  - elevation: 255 m (837 ft)
- Length: 64.2 km (39.9 mi)
- Basin size: 402 km^{2} (155 sq mi)
- Discharge
  - average: 9.9 m^{3}/s (350 cu ft/s)

Basin features
- Progression: Dordogne→ Gironde estuary→ Atlantic Ocean

The Luzège (French pronunciation: [lyzɛʒ]; Occitan: Luseja) is a 64.2 km (39.9 mi) long river in the Corrèze département, south-central France. Its source is on the Plateau de Millevaches, in Meymac, 7 km (4.3 mi) north-northwest of the town. It flows generally south. It is a right tributary of the Dordogne, into which it flows just to the south of Laval-sur-Luzège.

== Communes along its course ==
This list is ordered from source to mouth: Meymac, Combressol, Maussac, Darnets, Palisse, Lamazière-Basse, Moustier-Ventadour, Saint-Hilaire-Foissac, Lapleau, Saint-Pantaléon-de-Lapleau, Soursac, Laval-sur-Luzège
