= Soursac =

- Commune
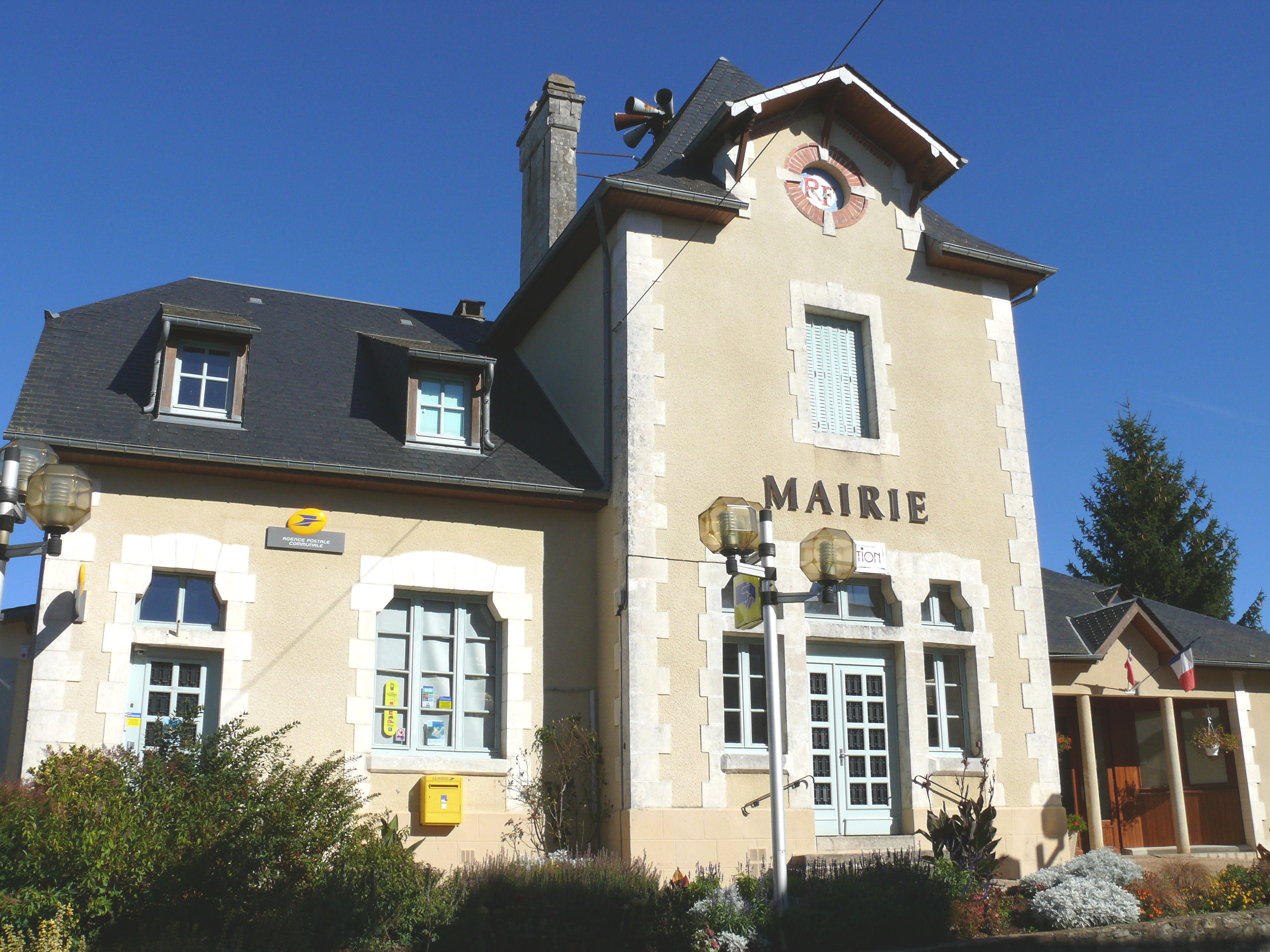
- Town hall and post office

- Coat of arms
- Location of Soursac
- Location within France Location within Nouvelle-Aquitaine
- Coordinates: 45°16′32″N 2°12′04″E
- Country: France
- Region: Nouvelle-Aquitaine
- Department: Corrèze
- Arrondissement: Ussel
- Canton: Égletons
- Intercommunality: Haute-Corrèze Communauté

Government
  - Mayor (2020–2026): Serge Guillaume
- Area^{1}: 42 km^{2} (16 sq mi)
- Highest elevation: 571 m (1,873 ft)
- Lowest elevation: 251 m (823 ft)
- Population (2023): 526
  - Density: 13/km^{2} (32/sq mi)
- Time zone: UTC+01:00 (CET)
  - Summer (DST): UTC+02:00 (CEST)
- INSEE/Postal code: 19264 /19550
- ^{1} French Land Register data, which excludes lakes, ponds, glaciers > 1 km^{2} (0.386 sq mi or 247 acres) and river estuaries.

Soursac (French pronunciation: [suʁsak]; Occitan: Sorçac) is a commune in the Corrèze department in central France.

== Geography ==
The Luzège forms most of the commune's western boundary, then flows into the Dordogne, which forms the commune's southern and eastern boundaries.

== Population ==
Historical population
Year	Pop.	±% p.a.
1968	968	—
1975	871	−1.50%
1982	696	−3.15%
1990	569	−2.49%
1999	505	−1.32%
2007	484	−0.53%
2012	504	+0.81%
2017	505	+0.04%
2023	526	+0.68%
Source: INSEE

== See also ==
- Communes of the Corrèze department
