= Égletons =

- Commune
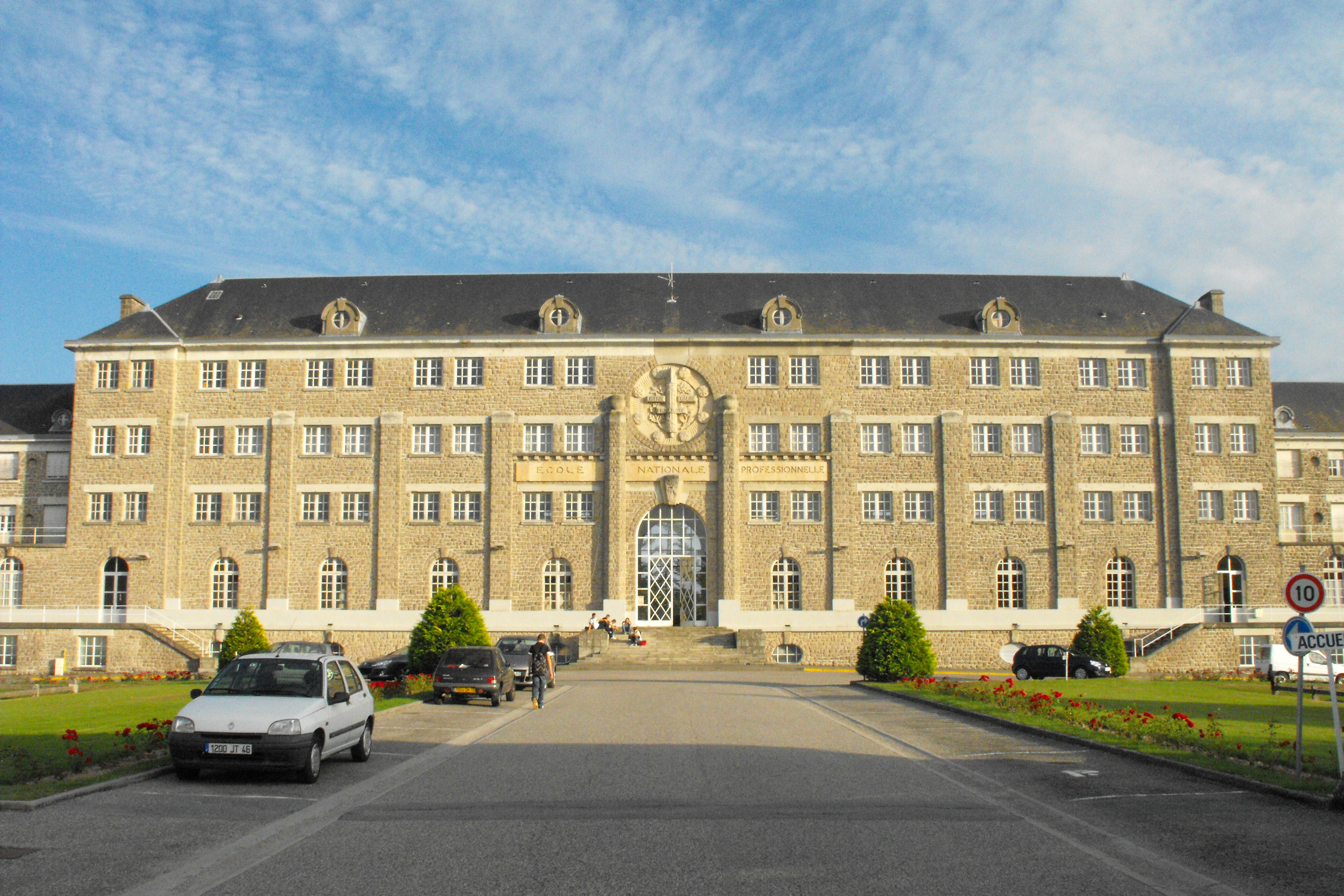
- Pierre Carminot Lycée

- Coat of arms
- Location of Égletons
- Location within France Location within Nouvelle-Aquitaine
- Coordinates: 45°24′26″N 2°02′46″E
- Country: France
- Region: Nouvelle-Aquitaine
- Department: Corrèze
- Arrondissement: Ussel
- Canton: Égletons

Government
  - Mayor (2020–2026): Charles Ferré
- Area^{1}: 16.85 km^{2} (6.51 sq mi)
- Highest elevation: 800 m (2,600 ft)
- Lowest elevation: 533 m (1,749 ft)
- Population (2023): 4,341
  - Density: 257.6/km^{2} (667.2/sq mi)
- Time zone: UTC+01:00 (CET)
  - Summer (DST): UTC+02:00 (CEST)
- INSEE/Postal code: 19073 /19300
- ^{1} French Land Register data, which excludes lakes, ponds, glaciers > 1 km^{2} (0.386 sq mi or 247 acres) and river estuaries.

Égletons (French pronunciation: [eɡlətɔ̃]; Aus Gletons in Occitan) is a commune in the department of Corrèze, Nouvelle-Aquitaine, southwestern France.

== Geography ==
=== Location ===
Égletons is located in the Massif Central at the crossroads of several geographical ensembles. The city leans up against the first foothills of the Limousine mountains (the Plateau de Millevaches in the north, and the Massif des Monédières to the west), and thus establishes itself on the high Corrèzian plateau and Italicdominating to the east, the gorges of the Dordogne. The municipality is located on the former Route nationale 89 now the D1089:

- 30 km east of Tulle
- 29 km west of Ussel
- 5 km from Exit 22 of the A89 autoroute connecting Bordeaux (260 kilometres) and Clermont-Ferrand (120 kilometres).

Égletons station has rail connections to Brive-la-Gaillarde, Ussel and Bordeaux.

=== Climate ===
The climate is Oceanic, so humid, but with cold winters and hot summers. Snowfall can occur in winter with temperatures often around 0 °C. Summer is sometimes followed by a mild autumn (Indian Summer).

Climate data for Égletons, elevation 610 m (2,000 ft), (1997–2020 normals, extremes 1997–present)
Month	Jan	Feb	Mar	Apr	May	Jun	Jul	Aug	Sep	Oct	Nov	Dec	Year
Record high °C (°F)	18.0 (64.4)	24.6 (76.3)	24.8 (76.6)	27.5 (81.5)	31.2 (88.2)	37.4 (99.3)	37.3 (99.1)	37.1 (98.8)	34.3 (93.7)	30.7 (87.3)	23.4 (74.1)	17.9 (64.2)	37.4 (99.3)
Mean daily maximum °C (°F)	6.6 (43.9)	7.8 (46.0)	11.6 (52.9)	14.7 (58.5)	18.4 (65.1)	22.5 (72.5)	24.2 (75.6)	24.3 (75.7)	20.7 (69.3)	16.2 (61.2)	10.3 (50.5)	7.5 (45.5)	15.4 (59.7)
Daily mean °C (°F)	3.2 (37.8)	3.7 (38.7)	6.7 (44.1)	9.5 (49.1)	13.1 (55.6)	16.8 (62.2)	18.3 (64.9)	18.2 (64.8)	15.0 (59.0)	11.5 (52.7)	6.6 (43.9)	4.0 (39.2)	10.6 (51.1)
Mean daily minimum °C (°F)	−0.2 (31.6)	−0.5 (31.1)	1.9 (35.4)	4.4 (39.9)	7.7 (45.9)	11.2 (52.2)	12.5 (54.5)	12.2 (54.0)	9.2 (48.6)	6.8 (44.2)	2.9 (37.2)	0.4 (32.7)	5.7 (42.3)
Record low °C (°F)	−12.2 (10.0)	−14.6 (5.7)	−15.5 (4.1)	−5.2 (22.6)	−1.3 (29.7)	2.8 (37.0)	4.0 (39.2)	4.8 (40.6)	−0.9 (30.4)	−6.3 (20.7)	−11.1 (12.0)	−13.0 (8.6)	−15.5 (4.1)
Average precipitation mm (inches)	142.5 (5.61)	112.5 (4.43)	129.8 (5.11)	134.4 (5.29)	112.2 (4.42)	97.8 (3.85)	93.2 (3.67)	90.0 (3.54)	90.0 (3.54)	114.5 (4.51)	152.4 (6.00)	159.2 (6.27)	1,428.5 (56.24)
Average precipitation days (≥ 1.0 mm)	14.1	11.1	12.6	13.1	12.6	9.6	9.0	9.8	9.1	11.4	14.1	13.5	139.9
Source: Meteociel

== Toponymy ==
The origin of the name Égletons (1075: from Glutonibus; 1251: from Glotos) is uncertain:

1. Man's name glutio, according to M. Villoutreix (in Noms de lieux du Limousin, ed. Hosiery 1998)
2. Latin medieval glutis, tenacious earth, clay, with prefix ès rental value, the name of this village pertaining to a muddy place, loamy where no doubt it was established (according to Jean Costes-Revue Lemouzi no 187-July 2008).

== History ==
In 1059 the city was the capital of the family of the Lords of Ventadour.

From their imposing fortress located on top of a rocky outcrop, the Ventadour made Égletons a prosperous city, promoting art and culture. Égletons was a center for the poetry of the Troubadours, such as Bernard de Ventadour, who recited poetry throughout Europe. Égletons still retains remnants of this stronghold today, with its ramparts at the five gates that bear the coat of arms of the Ventadour, the church of St. Antoine and its 12th century steeple armed with machicolations, and the chapel of the penitents.

In August 1944, the Battle of Égletons was fought. The fierce fighting, the numerous devastation and the courage of the inhabitants during the struggle for the liberation of the city, earned the medieval capital of the Ventadour, a citation of l'Ordre du Corps d'Armée with the awarding of the Croix de Guerre with silver-gilt star on 11 November 1948.

== Population ==
Historical population
Year	Pop.	±% p.a.
1968	3,669	—
1975	4,608	+3.31%
1982	4,590	−0.06%
1990	4,487	−0.28%
1999	4,087	−1.03%
2007	4,355	+0.80%
2012	4,446	+0.41%
2017	4,298	−0.67%
2023	4,341	+0.17%
Source: INSEE

== Economy ==
Égletons is renowned for its school buildings and public works.

- Lycée Pierre-Caraminot
- L'École d'Application aux métiers des Travaux Publics (EATP)
- Charal, a company specialising in fresh and frozen beef-based products, has a production site.

== Heritage ==
=== Places and monuments ===
- The ramparts (remnants).
- The house of d'Ambert de Sérilhac.
- The profession of shoeing the cows.
- L'église Saint-Antoine-l'ermite (steeple (12th-18th century), porch (late 12th century) and stained glass (1956)).
- Chapelle de l'Hôpital (13th century) then of the Brotherhood of the White penitents (17th century)
- Rectory.
- Fountains.
- Centre de Découverte du Moyen Âge (Discovery Centre of the Middle Ages) - heritage of the city of Égletons
- The Town Planning Project of the city of Egletons 1929-1979. In 2009, the Ministry of Culture awarded the city the label, Heritage of 20th Century, for its remarkable architecture and its urban ensemble from the years 1930 to 1960. See: The monumental gate of Stade François Chassaing (René Blanchot, 1936), the l'École Nationale Professionnelle (Robert Danis (architect), 1934), le Bâtiment Central du Village de Vacances (Roland Schweitzer, 1966), les vitraux de l'église (Blanchet and Lesage, 1956) etc.

=== Parks and green spaces ===
The commune is a flower town having obtained two flowers on the 2007 list of the Concours des villes et villages fleuris. It retained this recognition in 2008.

=== History of street names ===
Paule Morot-Cabanac wrote the book Égletons et ses rues (Égletons and its streets) in which it lists the streets of the city and explains the origin of the names given to them. This is a highly documented book that had required long months of research and preparation for this former history-loving teacher. This book is currently no longer available for sale.

=== Motto ===
The motto of the city is "Inania Pello", it means "I reject the vain things"

== Notable people ==
- Bernard de Ventadour (~ 1125-~ 1195), famous troubadour.
- Octave Lacroix (1827-1901), journalist and poet.
- Leonard Louis Bordas (1864-?), an entomologist specialised in the glandular apparatus of Hymenoptera insects, digestive tubes of Orthoptera etc.
- Edmond Vignard (1885-1969), French chemist and archaeologist Prehistorian Egyptologist, he is the namer of the Sebilian culture.
- Charles Spinasse (1893-1979), politician
- Roland Bondonny (1932-2005), poisoner
- Bertrand Eveno (1944-), senior official and press baron.
- Bernadette Bourzai (1945-), political woman
- Fabien Domingo (1976-), rugby union player
- Thomas Domingo (1985-), rugby union player, brother of the former.
- Jean-Marie Bourre (1945), member of the National Academy of Physicians and former director of INSERM research units of neuro-toxicology and neuro-pharmaco-nutrition.
- Michel Paillassou (1962-2014), engineer, mayor of Egletons, General councillor, President of the community of communes of Ventadour, departmental president of the UMP
- Charles Ferré (1952-), politician UMP, mayor of Egletons (September 2014-),
- Gout Nicolas (1980-), famous troubadour.

== See also ==
- Communes of the Corrèze department
