= Lapleau =

- Commune
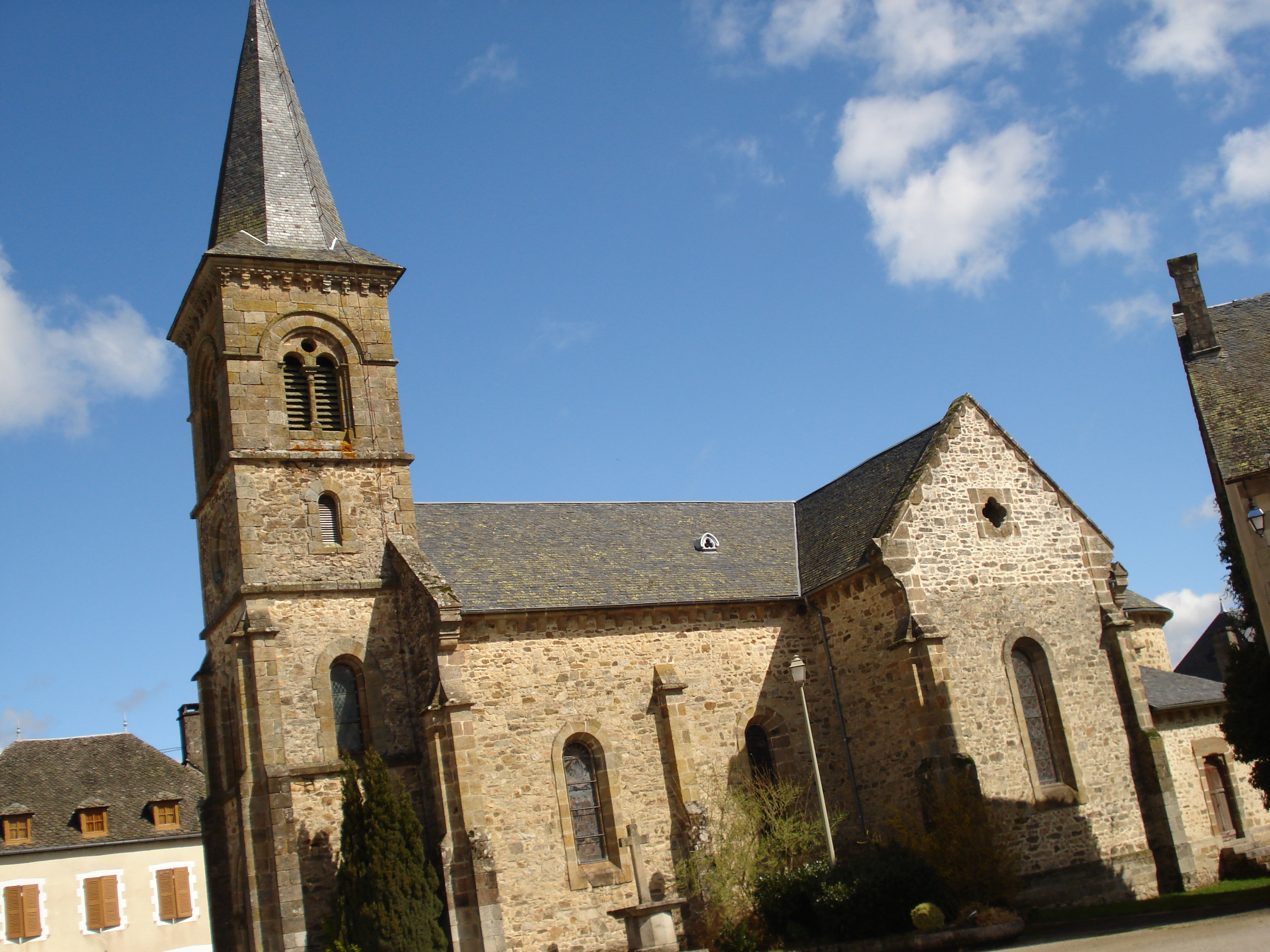
- The church in Lapleau

- Coat of arms
- Location of Lapleau
- Location within France Location within Nouvelle-Aquitaine
- Coordinates: 45°17′40″N 2°10′03″E
- Country: France
- Region: Nouvelle-Aquitaine
- Department: Corrèze
- Arrondissement: Ussel
- Canton: Égletons

Government
  - Mayor (2022–2026): Sofia Barbosa
- Area^{1}: 17.76 km^{2} (6.86 sq mi)
- Population (2023): 393
  - Density: 22.1/km^{2} (57.3/sq mi)
- Time zone: UTC+01:00 (CET)
  - Summer (DST): UTC+02:00 (CEST)
- INSEE/Postal code: 19106 /19550
- ^{1} French Land Register data, which excludes lakes, ponds, glaciers > 1 km^{2} (0.386 sq mi or 247 acres) and river estuaries.

Lapleau (French pronunciation: [laplo]; Occitan: La Plèu) is a commune in the Corrèze department in central France.

== Geography ==
The Luzège forms the commune's eastern boundary.

== Population ==
Historical population
Year	Pop.	±% p.a.
1968	586	—
1975	542	−1.11%
1982	516	−0.70%
1990	514	−0.05%
1999	525	+0.24%
2007	408	−3.10%
2012	392	−0.80%
2017	381	−0.57%
2023	393	+0.52%
Source: INSEE

== See also ==
- Communes of the Corrèze department
