= Argentat =

Commune in Corrèze, France

- Part of Argentat-sur-Dordogne
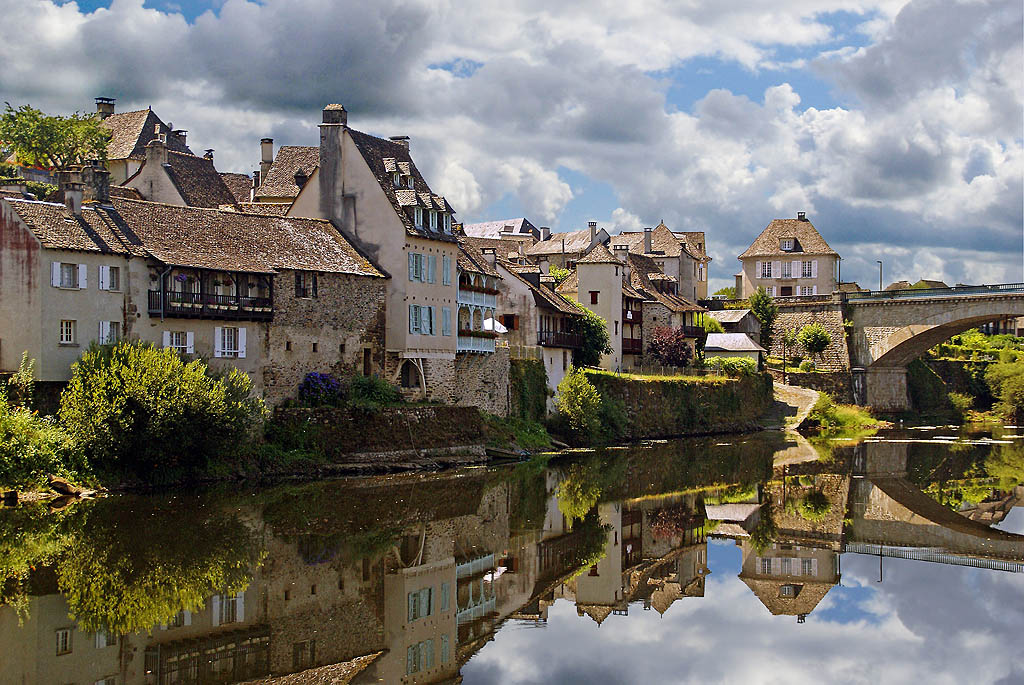
- The river Dordogne

- Coat of arms
- Location of Argentat
- Location within France Location within Nouvelle-Aquitaine
- Coordinates: 45°05′39″N 1°56′19″E
- Country: France
- Region: Nouvelle-Aquitaine
- Department: Corrèze
- Arrondissement: Tulle
- Canton: Argentat
- Commune: Argentat-sur-Dordogne
- Area^{1}: 22.41 km^{2} (8.65 sq mi)
- Elevation: 188 m (617 ft)
- Highest elevation: 441 m (1,447 ft)
- Lowest elevation: 166 m (545 ft)
- Population (2022): 2,723
  - Density: 121.5/km^{2} (314.7/sq mi)
- Time zone: UTC+01:00 (CET)
  - Summer (DST): UTC+02:00 (CEST)
- Postal code: 19400
- ^{1} French Land Register data, which excludes lakes, ponds, glaciers > 1 km^{2} (0.386 sq mi or 247 acres) and river estuaries.

Argentat (French pronunciation: [aʁʒɑ̃ta]) is a former commune in the Corrèze department in the Nouvelle-Aquitaine region of central France. On 1 January 2017, it was merged into the new commune Argentat-sur-Dordogne.

== History ==
Argentat lies on the border of three regions, Nouvelle-Aquitaine, Occitanie and Auvergne-Rhône-Alpes, although it officially lies within the Nouvelle-Aquitaine region. It also lies on the river Dordogne below some deep gorges with tumultuous water. This location makes the town of some importance due to the bridges crossing the Dordogne and the important river traffic to Bergerac and Libourne.

Since Gallic times a village perched on a nearby hill, the Puy-du-Tour, has controlled the ford on a protohistoric way connecting Armorica to the Mediterranean. A Roman villa was established on the plain of Longour, a farming-oriented area, close to the Dordogne.

In Merovingian times there was a mint to facilitate trade.

Under the Carolingians, Argentat was the seat of a vicariate - a territorial division under the authority of a count with a priest administering justice.

From the 10th century Argentat is known to have had a priory and a priest in a walled city. The town depended on a religious lord, the Prior of Carennac, and a lay lord, the Viscount of Turenne. Guarding his rights the Viscounty did not grant any charter of liberties and the local community had to be content until, in 1615, parish trustees were appointed to manage it. However, from 1263, the Turennes conceded an important market on the Saint Andrew's day to the town which is the oldest fair in Lower Limousin. Argentat sided with the Huguenots in the Wars of religion which created a troubled situation for half a century.

In the 17th century, with the Counter-Reformation and the subsequent establishment of the Recollects and the Poor Clares around 1633 and the Ursulines in 1637, the struggles gradually subsided. With the annexation of Viscounty to the Crown in 1738, Argentat became the seat of a sub-delegation of the management of Limoges.

The town experienced significant economic growth in the 18th and 19th centuries from Inland navigation by scows, which were known locally as courpet, that allowed the delivery of goods (mainly oak staves for cooperage and carassonne-stakes for grapevines) to the Bordeaux region. This activity began to decline at the end of the 19th century following the outbreak of phylloxera, which devastated the vineyards, and the inauguration of the PO Corrèze railway between Tulle and Argentat in 1904 (this line remained in operation until 1970).

=== Heraldry ===
Arms of Argentat	Blazon: Azure, two keys Argent addorsed posed in pale with interlaced rings.

== Geography ==
Argentat is situated on the river Dordogne, 30 km south-east of Tulle, 30 km east by south-east of Brive-la-Gaillarde, and some 15 km south-west of Saint-Privat. Access to the commune is by road D1120 from Saint-Chamant in the north-west passing through the town and continuing south-east to Montvert. The D980 goes from the town north-east to Saint-Privat. The D12 goes south-west from the town to Brivezac. The D33 branches off the D1120 east of the town and goes south to La Chapelle-Saint-Geraud. The D169 goes west from the town to Neuville. The D18 goes north-east from the village and continues north to Saint-Martin-la-Meanne. The D131 branches off the D18 and goes north to Saint-Bazile-de-la-Roche. The D129 goes north-east to the Barrage du Chastang. The D116 goes south from the town to connect to the hamlets of L'Hopital and Les Etables. Apart from the large town area the commune is mostly forest with some farming north and south of the town.

The Dordogne flows through the town and the commune from north to south with the Maronne flowing through the commune from the east and joining the Dordogne at the south-western corner of the commune. At the northern border of the commune the Doustre flows into the Dordogne. Several other streams flow into the Dordogne in the commune including the Ruisseau du Laie.

=== Climate ===
Climate data for Argentat (1995–2020 normals, extremes 1995–present)
Month	Jan	Feb	Mar	Apr	May	Jun	Jul	Aug	Sep	Oct	Nov	Dec	Year
Record high °C (°F)	19.2 (66.6)	25.8 (78.4)	28.7 (83.7)	31.5 (88.7)	34.1 (93.4)	40.7 (105.3)	41.8 (107.2)	41.6 (106.9)	37.7 (99.9)	33.5 (92.3)	27.0 (80.6)	19.0 (66.2)	41.8 (107.2)
Mean daily maximum °C (°F)	9.8 (49.6)	11.6 (52.9)	15.7 (60.3)	18.7 (65.7)	22.1 (71.8)	26.3 (79.3)	28.4 (83.1)	28.5 (83.3)	24.8 (76.6)	20.1 (68.2)	13.5 (56.3)	10.1 (50.2)	19.1 (66.4)
Daily mean °C (°F)	5.1 (41.2)	5.8 (42.4)	8.8 (47.8)	11.6 (52.9)	15.2 (59.4)	19.0 (66.2)	20.8 (69.4)	20.8 (69.4)	17.2 (63.0)	13.9 (57.0)	8.6 (47.5)	5.4 (41.7)	12.7 (54.9)
Mean daily minimum °C (°F)	0.4 (32.7)	−0.1 (31.8)	1.9 (35.4)	4.6 (40.3)	8.3 (46.9)	11.8 (53.2)	13.2 (55.8)	13.0 (55.4)	9.6 (49.3)	7.8 (46.0)	3.6 (38.5)	0.7 (33.3)	6.2 (43.2)
Record low °C (°F)	−11.9 (10.6)	−15.2 (4.6)	−13.2 (8.2)	−6.2 (20.8)	−1.8 (28.8)	0.6 (33.1)	4.5 (40.1)	2.5 (36.5)	−0.6 (30.9)	−6.5 (20.3)	−10.8 (12.6)	−14.8 (5.4)	−15.2 (4.6)
Average precipitation mm (inches)	103.6 (4.08)	86.8 (3.42)	86.8 (3.42)	107.8 (4.24)	102.7 (4.04)	88.5 (3.48)	74.3 (2.93)	73.7 (2.90)	85.2 (3.35)	101.3 (3.99)	118.5 (4.67)	116.3 (4.58)	1,145.5 (45.10)
Average precipitation days (≥ 1.0 mm)	12.8	10.7	11.0	12.2	11.3	9.5	7.9	8.8	9.2	11.5	12.9	12.7	130.5
Source: Meteociel

== Demography ==
The inhabitants of the commune are known as Argentacois or Argentacoises in French.

Historical population

Year	Pop.	±% p.a.
1793	2,850	—
1800	2,574	−1.44%
1806	2,629	+0.35%
1821	2,822	+0.47%
1831	3,121	+1.01%
1836	3,029	−0.60%
1841	3,156	+0.82%
1846	3,318	+1.01%
1851	3,535	+1.28%
1856	3,520	−0.09%
1861	3,435	−0.49%
1866	3,449	+0.08%
1872	3,350	−0.48%
1876	3,380	+0.22%
1881	3,304	−0.45%
1886	3,262	−0.26%
1891	3,087	−1.10%
1896	3,093	+0.04%

Year	Pop.	±% p.a.
1901	2,801	−1.96%
1906	2,830	+0.21%
1911	2,895	+0.46%
1921	2,578	−1.15%
1926	2,539	−0.30%
1931	2,560	+0.16%
1936	2,620	+0.46%
1946	3,241	+2.15%
1954	3,451	+0.79%
1962	3,196	−0.95%
1968	3,256	+0.31%
1975	3,371	+0.50%
1982	3,234	−0.59%
1990	3,189	−0.18%
1999	3,125	−0.23%
2007	3,105	−0.08%
2012	3,005	−0.65%

Source: EHESS and INSEE

== Local government ==
List of Successive Mayors

From	To	Name	Party	Position
1989	2014	René Teulade	PS	Vice President of the General Council, Senator, former Minister
2014	2014	François Bretin	PCF	Interim Mayor on the death of Mr Teulade, general councillor for the Canton of Argentat since 2011
2014	2016	Jean-Claude Leygnac		

=== Twinning ===
Argentat has twinning associations with:

- Bad König (Germany).
- Rural community of Sakal (Senegal).

== Culture and heritage ==
=== Civil heritage ===
There are four sites in the commune that are registered as historical monuments:

- The Eyrial Manor at Rue Theil (1457)
- The Barns/Stables next to the hospital (18th century)
- The Grave de Roland Menhir at La Marque (Neolithic)
- The Chateau du Bac (16th century). The façade is from the 18th century and the dovecote from the 16th century.

Other sites of interest

- The Dordogne is an impressive sight and flows beneath a viaduct, Le Pont de la République, linking the north and south sections of the town.
- Heritage House contains a Painting: Portrait of Antoine Veilhan (1650) which is registered as an historical object.
- The Boatmen's cross
- The Lestourgie Masonry Pier from the 19th century with a beautiful promenade on the right bank of the Dordogne.
- The Hotel de Turenne (the "Raymondie") at 13 rue des Clarisses
- The Rue Porte-Basse
- The Birthplace of General Delmas
- The Filliol house (16th century), formerly the post office
- The Barrage d'Argentat (Argentat Dam)
- The Cinema (formerly a hospice) contains a Bronze Bell (1525) which is registered as an historical object.

=== Religious heritage ===
The Church of Saint Peter contains many items that are registered as historical objects:

- Container for Baptismal water (18th century)
- A White Chasuble (19th century)
- A Rose Chasuble (19th century)
- A Chalice with Paten from the White Penitents (1806)
- A Sideboard door in the Sacristy (18th century)
- 2 Busts/Reliquaries: Saints Clair and Peter (18th century)
- The Pediment of the Retable of the Virgin (18th century)
- A framed Painting: Calvary (18th century)
- The Pediment of the Retable of the main Altar (1753)
- Containers for holy oil (1752)
- A Chalice with Paten (18th century)
- A Processional Cross (disappeared) (16th century)
- A Bronze Bell (1538)
- A Processional Cross (13th century)
- A Chalice (18th century)

Other religious sites of interest

- The Recollects Convent, founded in the early 17th century.
- The Convent of the Poor Clares at 7 Rue des Clarisses
- The Chateau Neuville, also known as Chateau Fénelon
- The Chapelle-aux-Plats, a former parish merged with the commune of Argentat. Its chateau belonged to a branch of the Pestels family
- The Fortified Chapel built in the late 19th century on Rue des Clarisses

== Notable persons ==
- Antoine Guillaume Delmas (1766-1813), General of the French Revolution, killed in action at the Battle of Leipzig
- Eusèbe Bombal (1827-1915), historian of Argentat, ethnologist, local archaeologist, precursor of Limousin folklore
- Auguste Lestourgie (1833-1885), Mayor of Argentat and MP for Corrèze
- Jean Douvisis, (1866-1926), creator of the agricultural associations of France.
- René Caillier (1879-1946), politician
- Emmanuel Berl (1892-1976), journalist, historian and essayist, stayed in Argentat during the Second World War
- Mireille Hartuch (1906-1996), singer and actress with the stage name Mireille, lived at Argentat with her husband Emmanuel Berl
- René Teulade (1931-2014), politician. Senator and Mayor of Argentat, former Minister of Social Affairs and Integration

== Culture ==
=== Philately ===
A postage stamp worth 4.40 francs portraying the Lestourgie dock and beautiful renovated houses in Argentat was issued on 18 June 1994.

=== Cinema ===
Several movies and TV series have been shot in the commune. In particular:

- 1995: TV series La Rivière Espérance by Josée Dayan

== Gallery ==
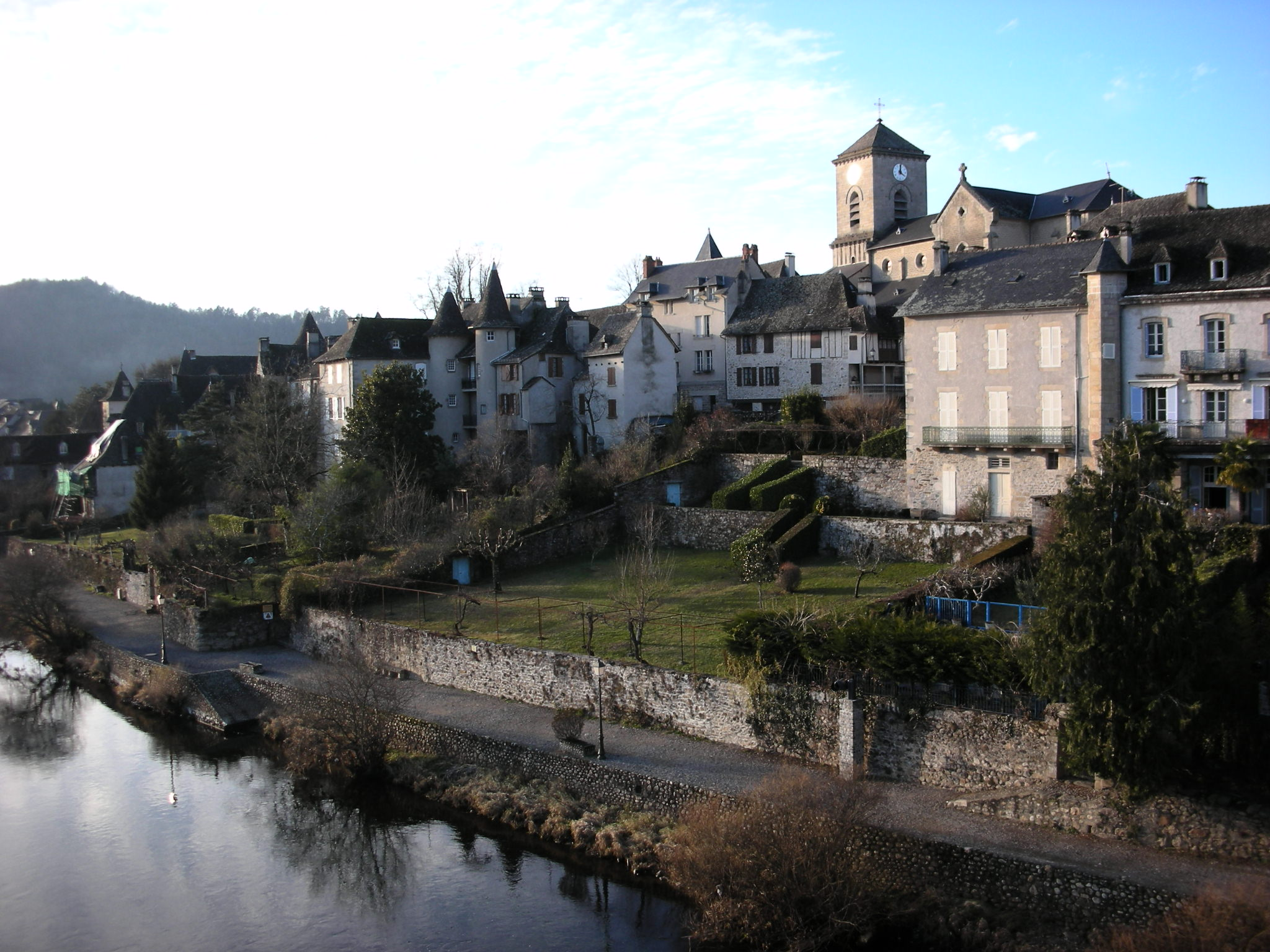

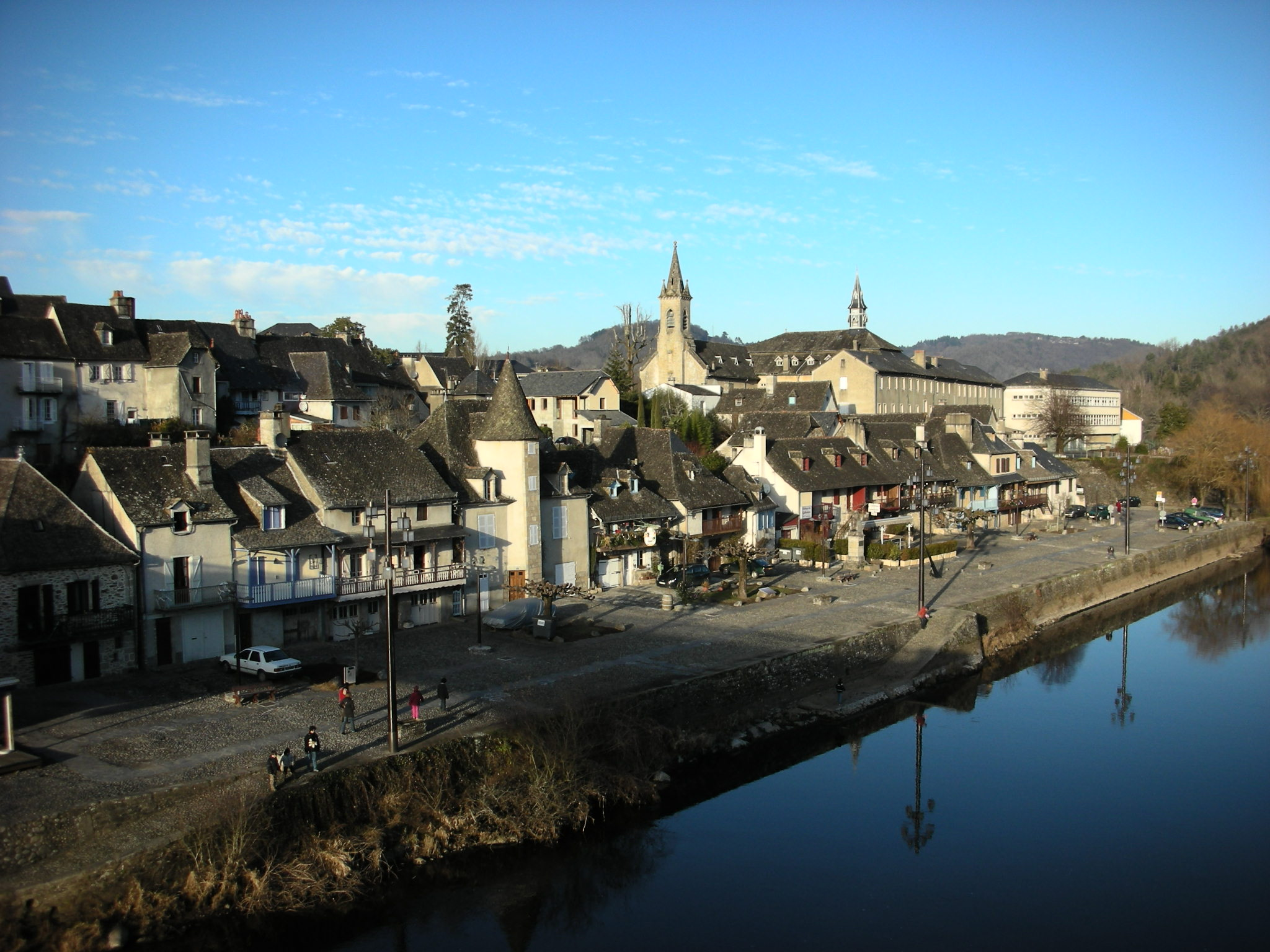

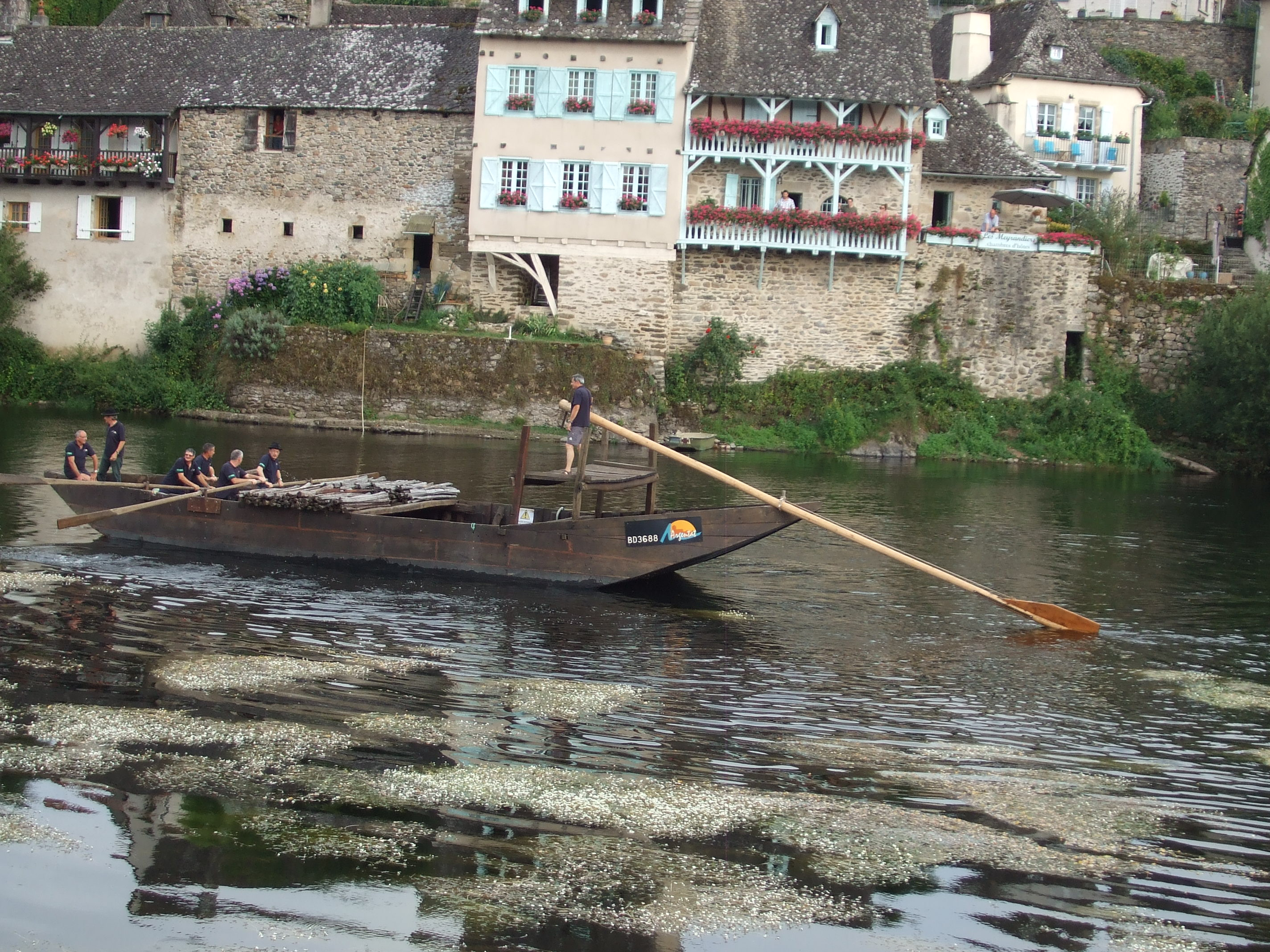
A scow or courpet

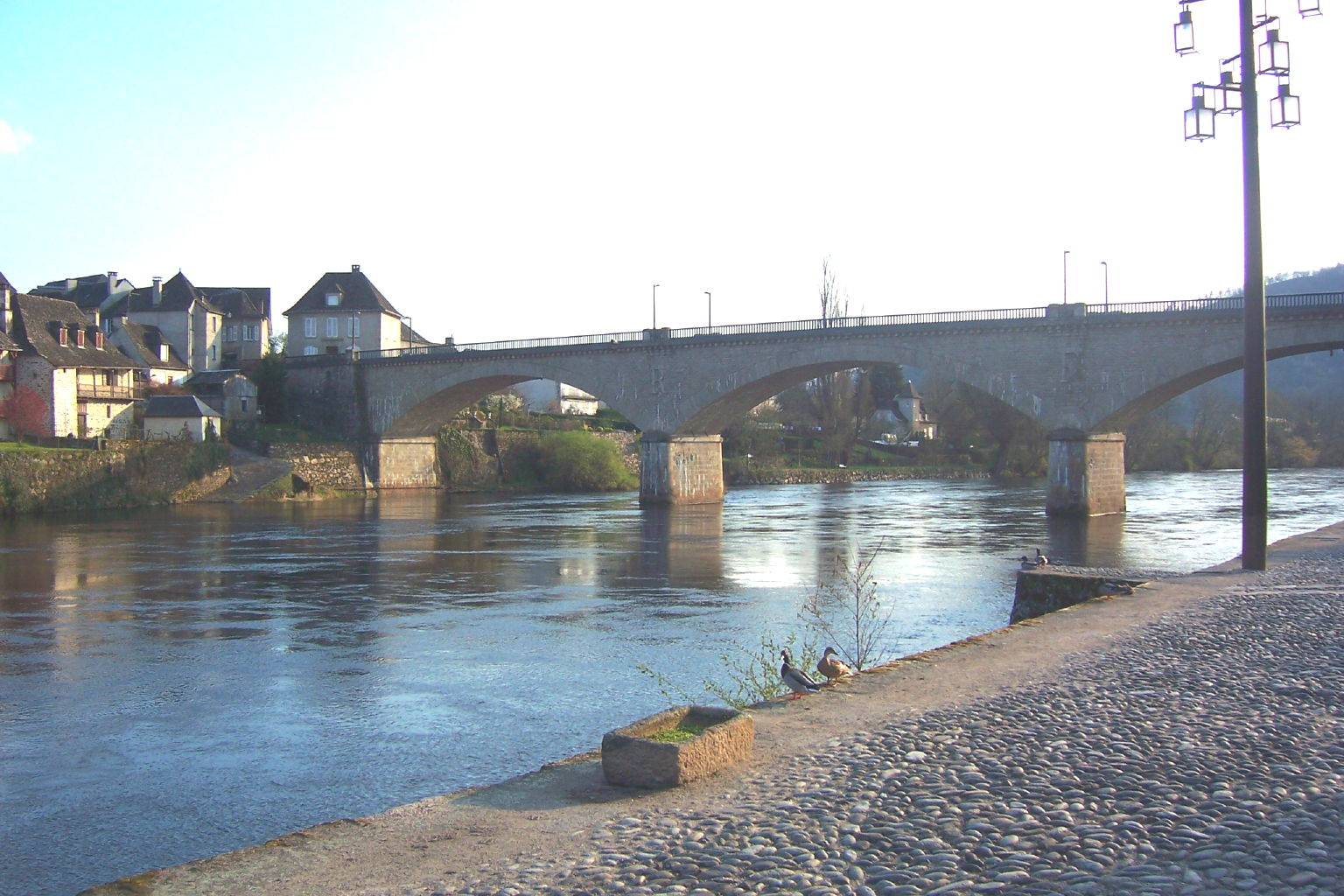
Bridge over the Dordogne

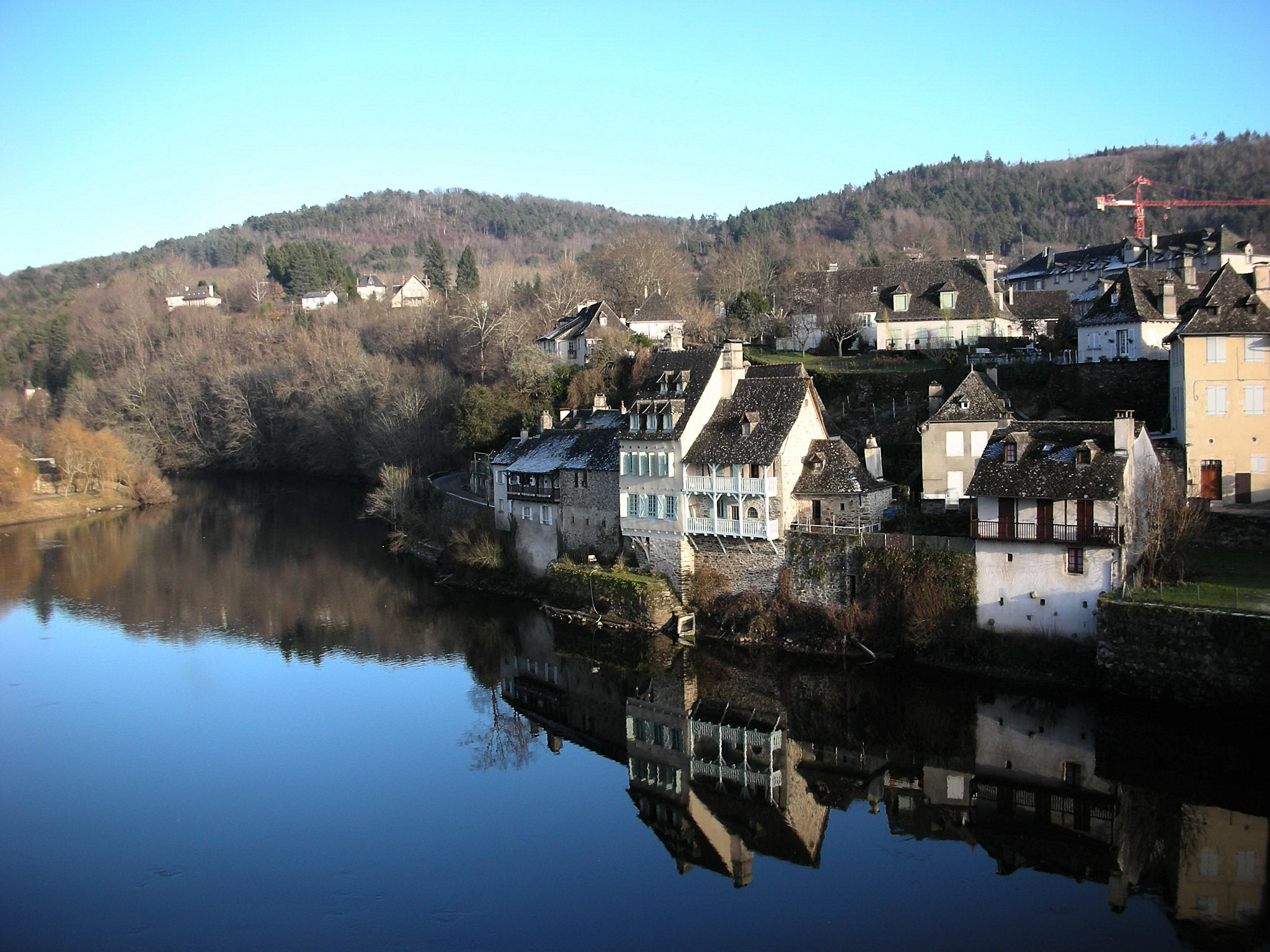
Argentat Quay

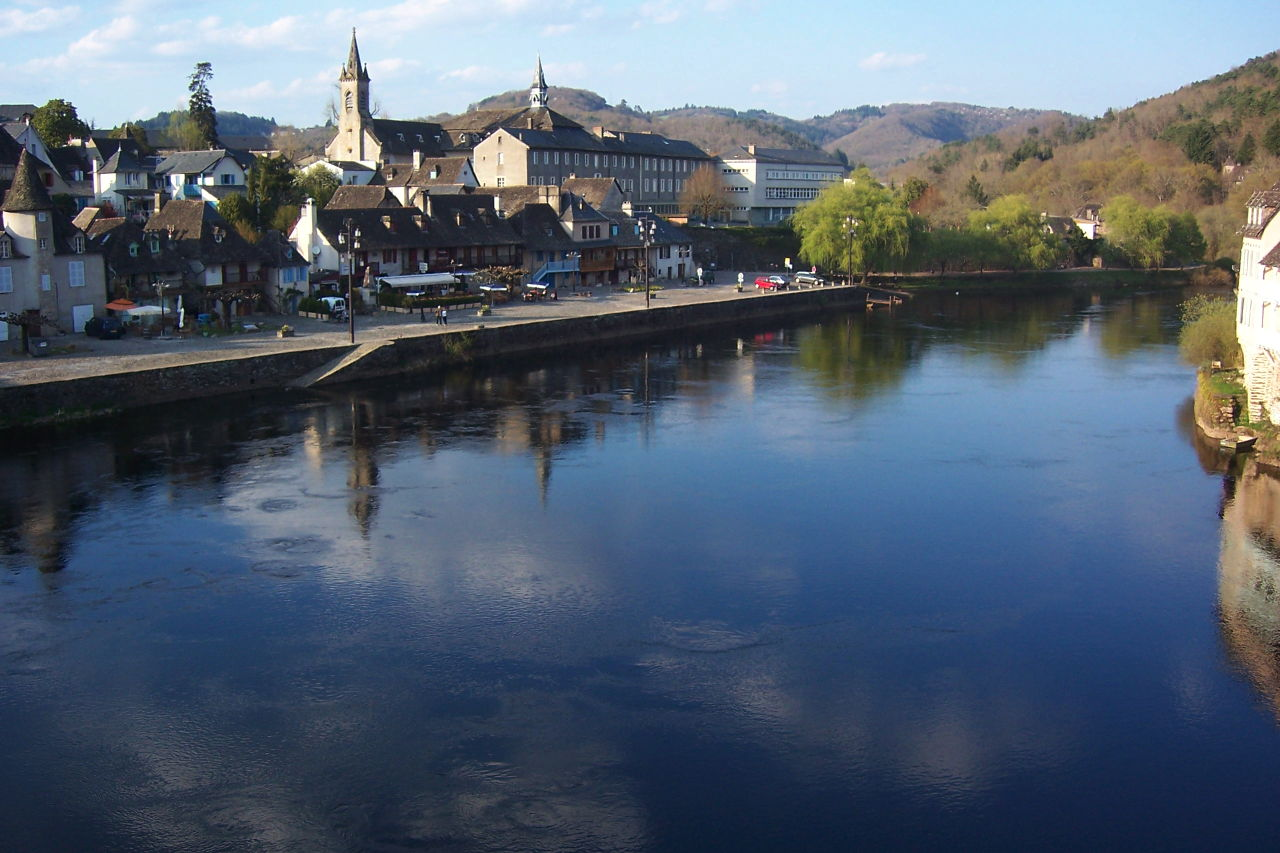
Dordogne right bank

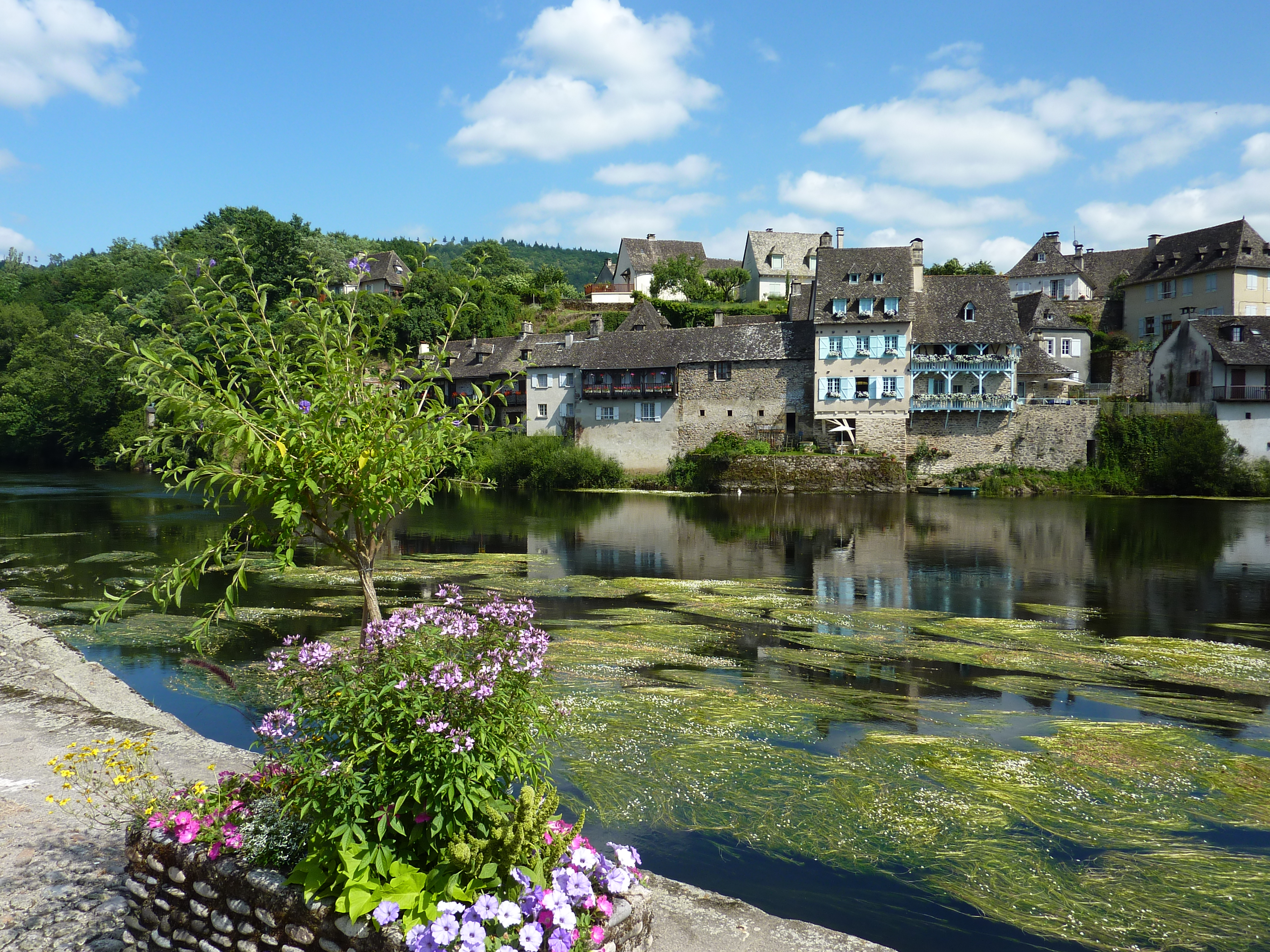

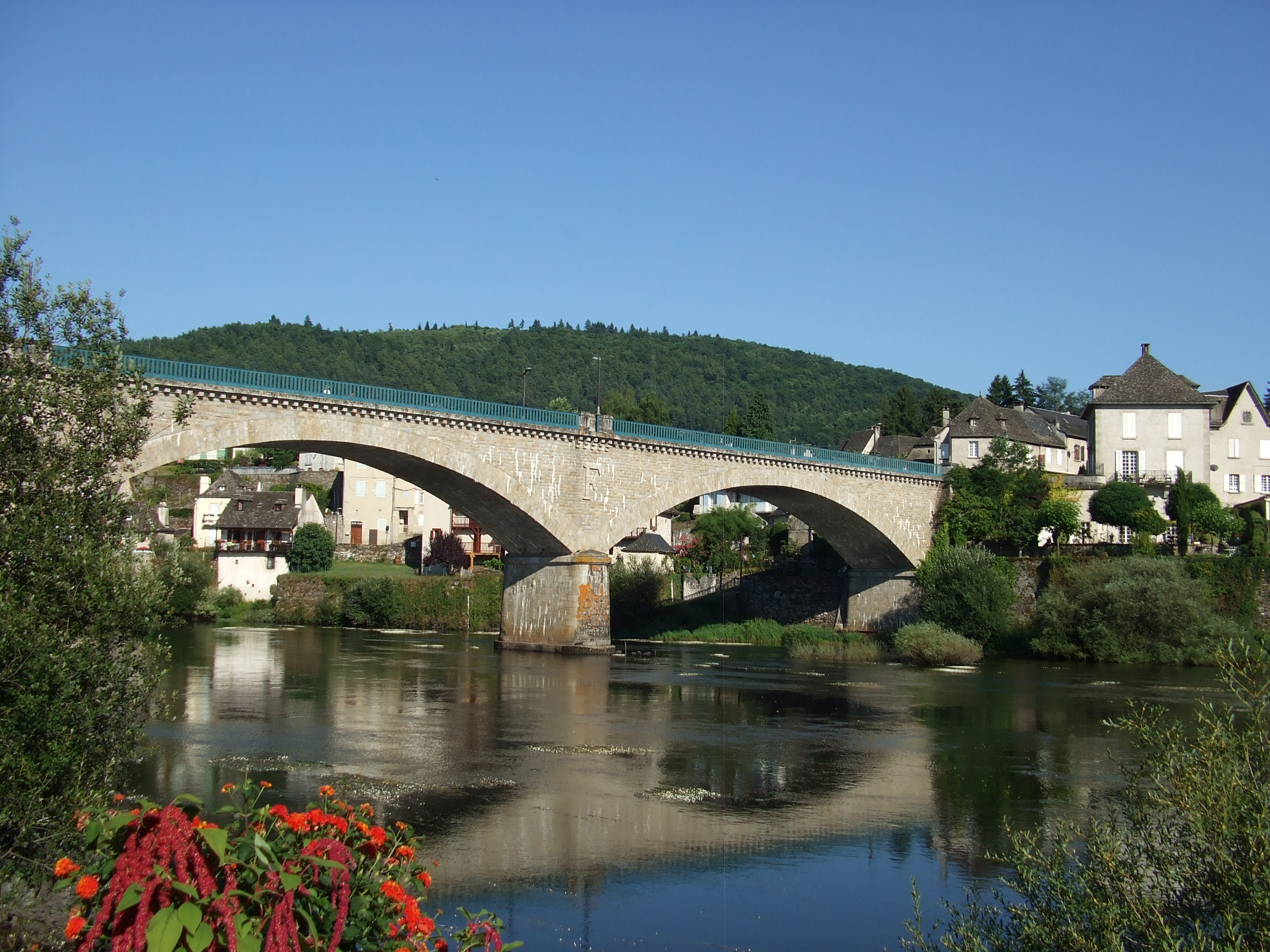
Henry IV Bridge

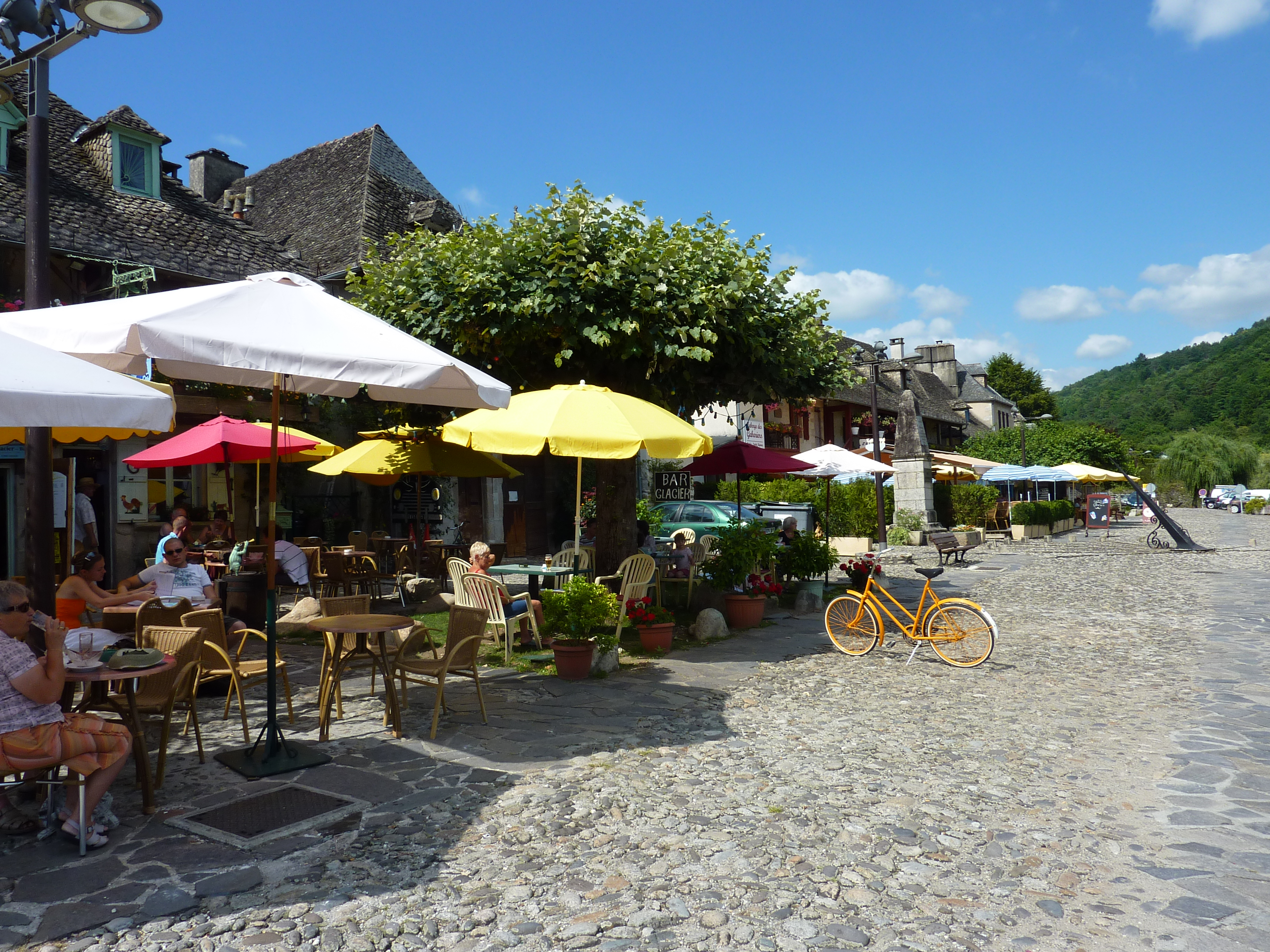
On the Quay

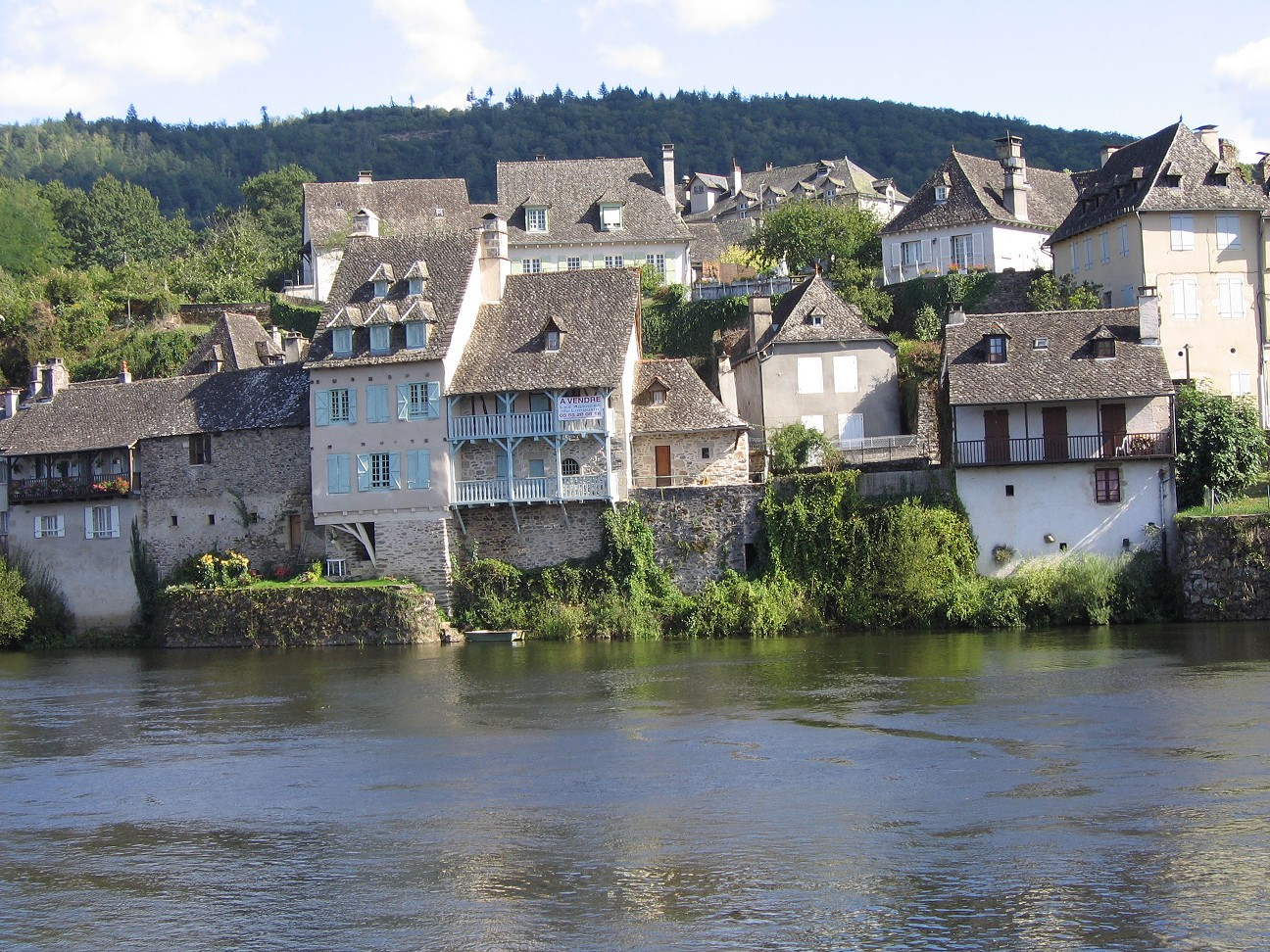

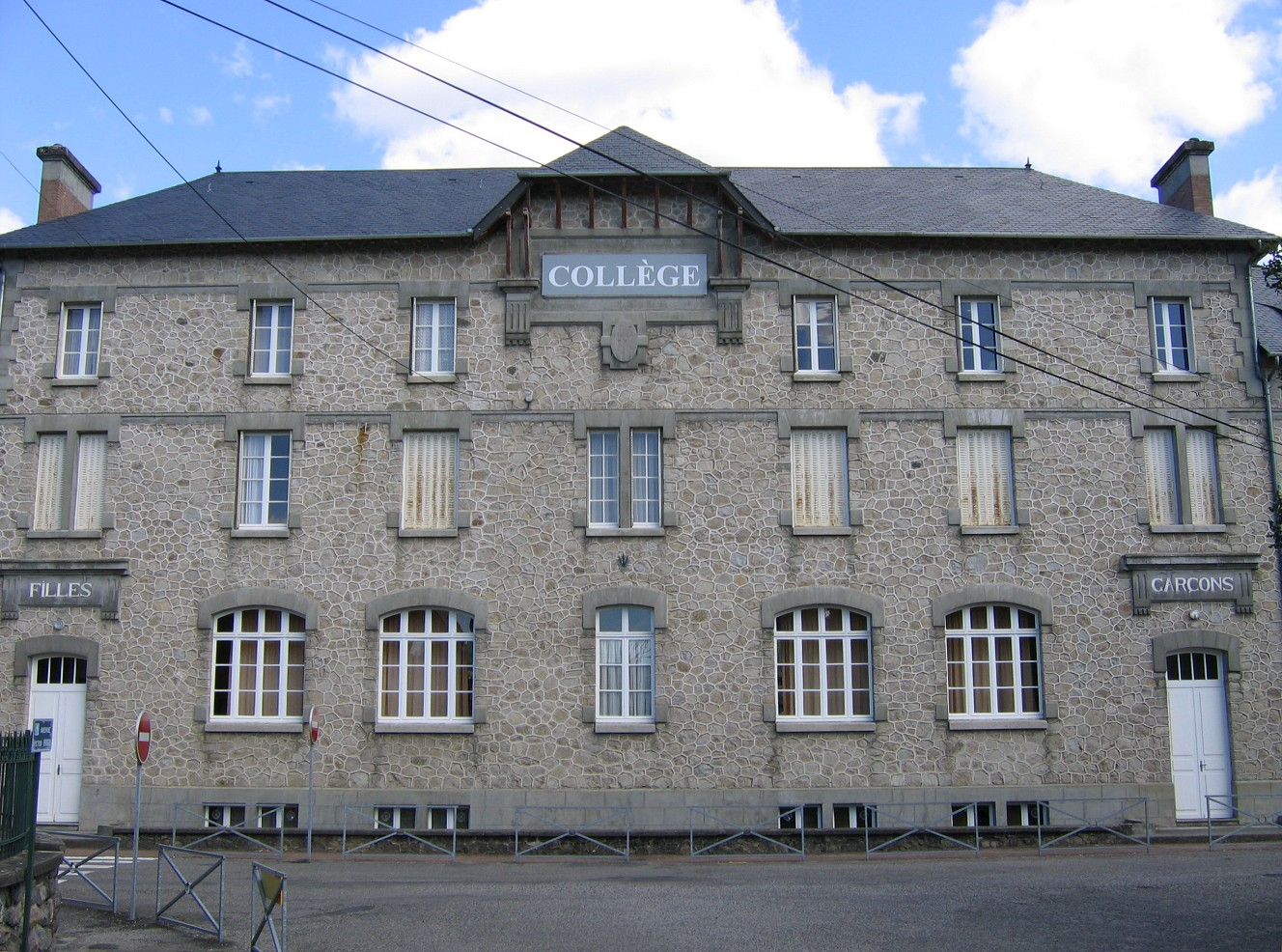
School

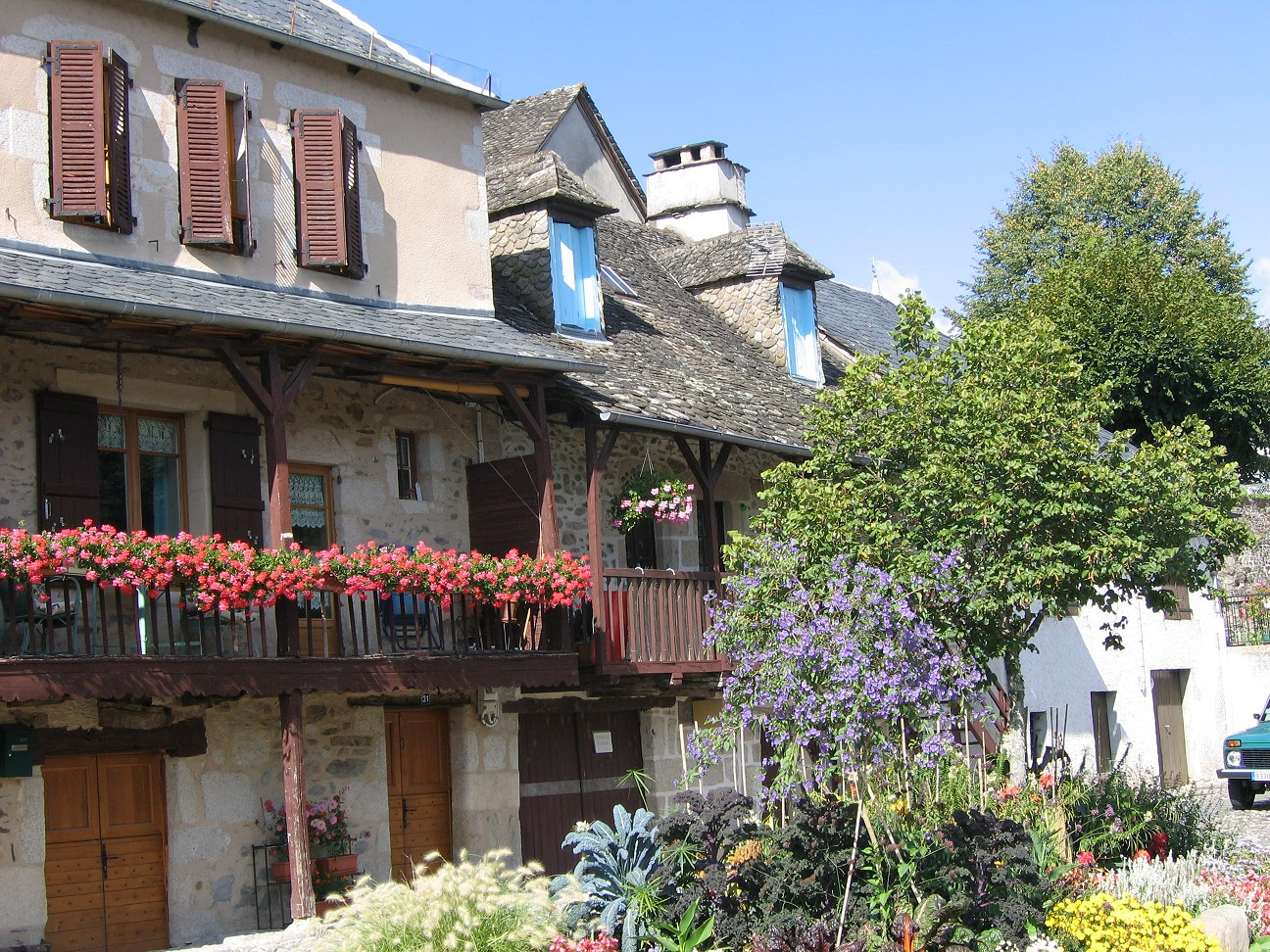

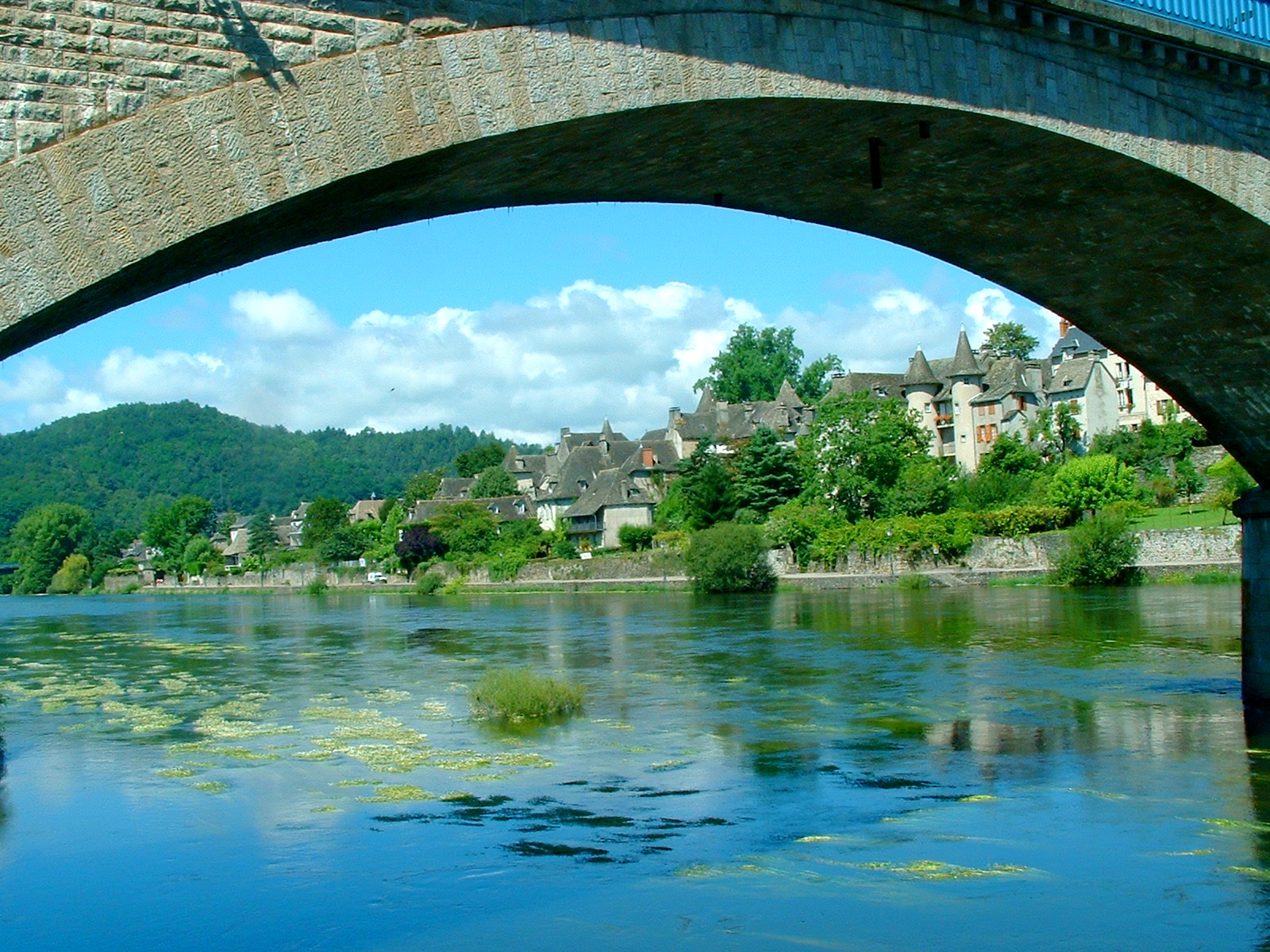
Stone Bridge

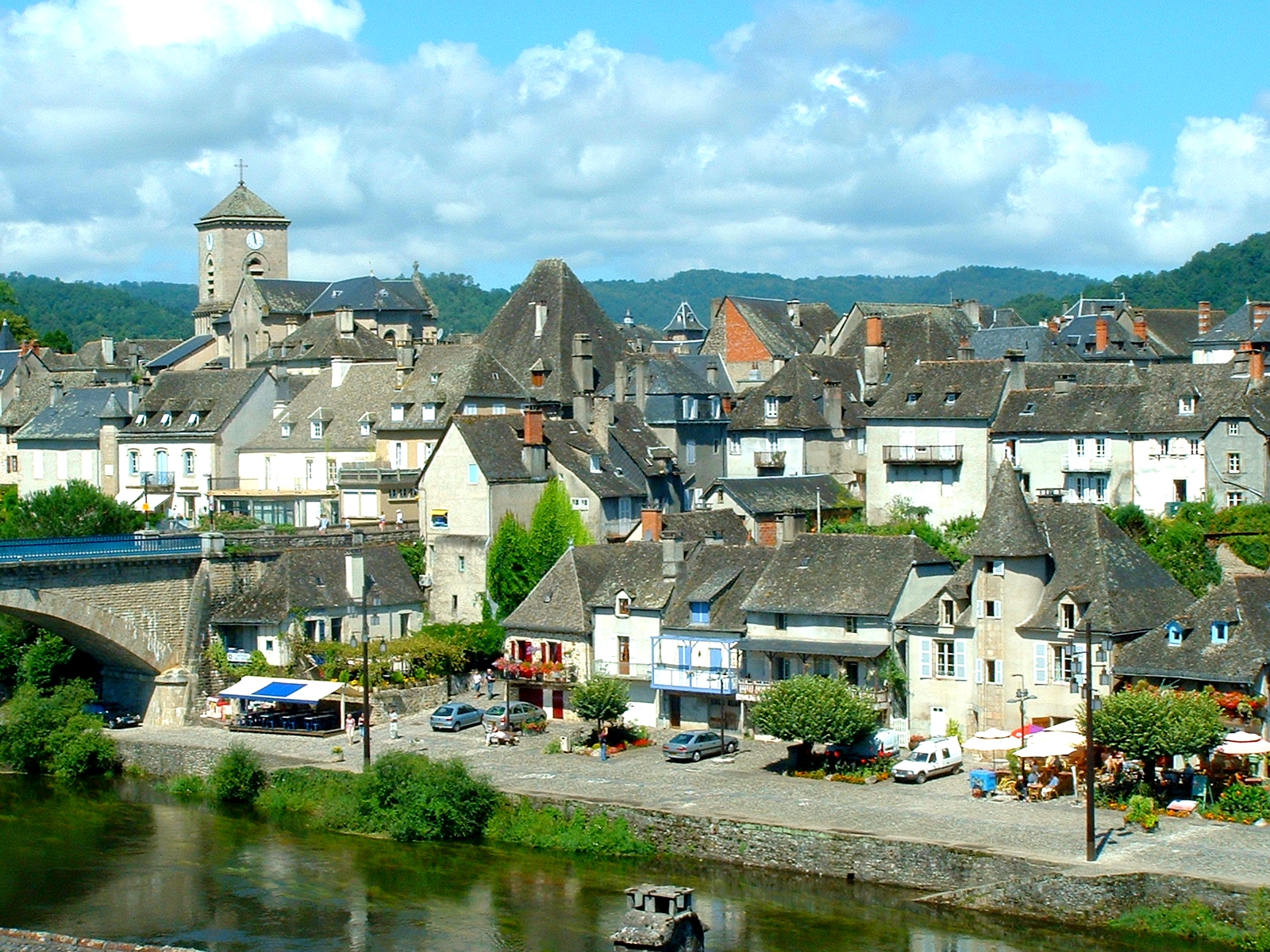

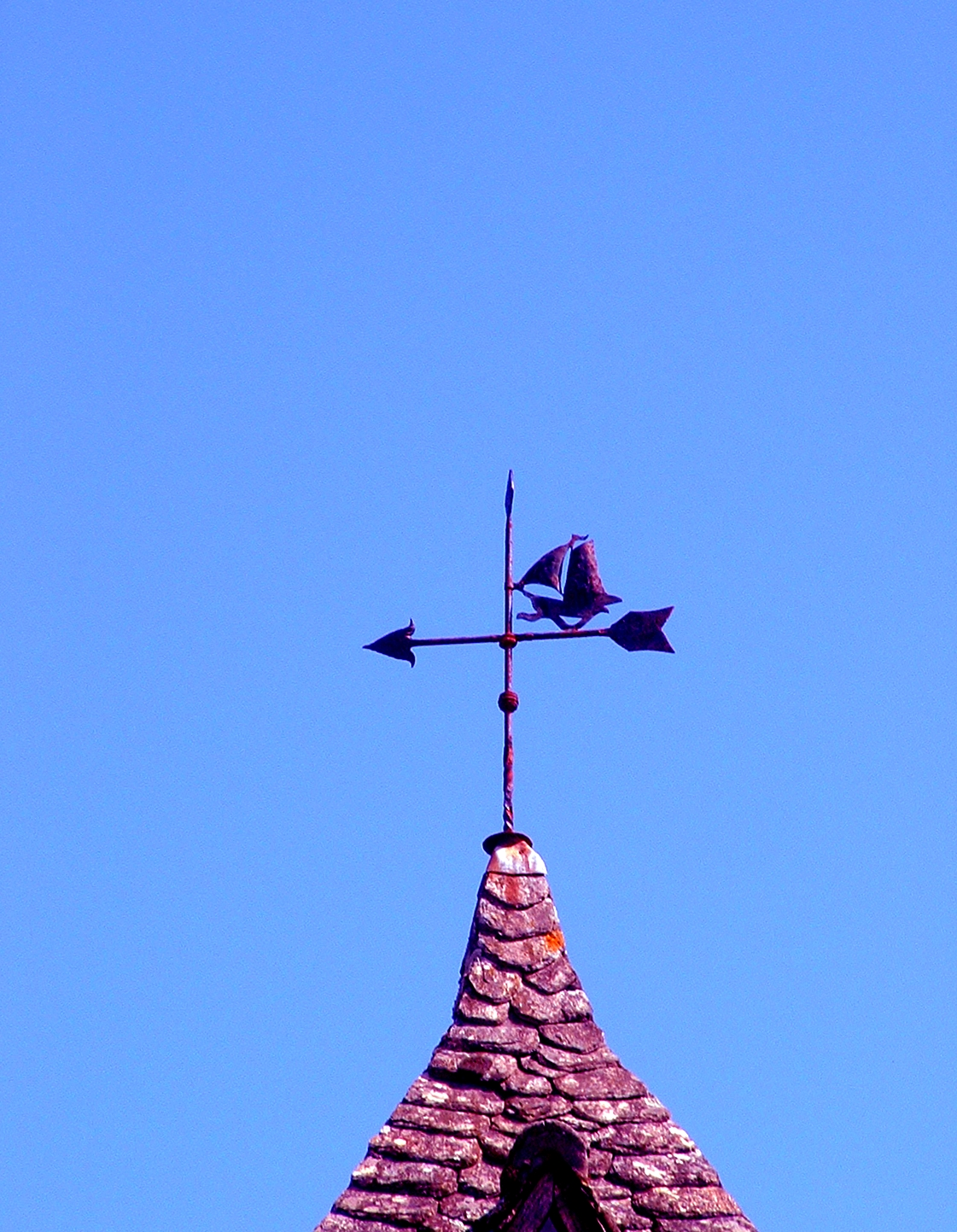
Weathervane

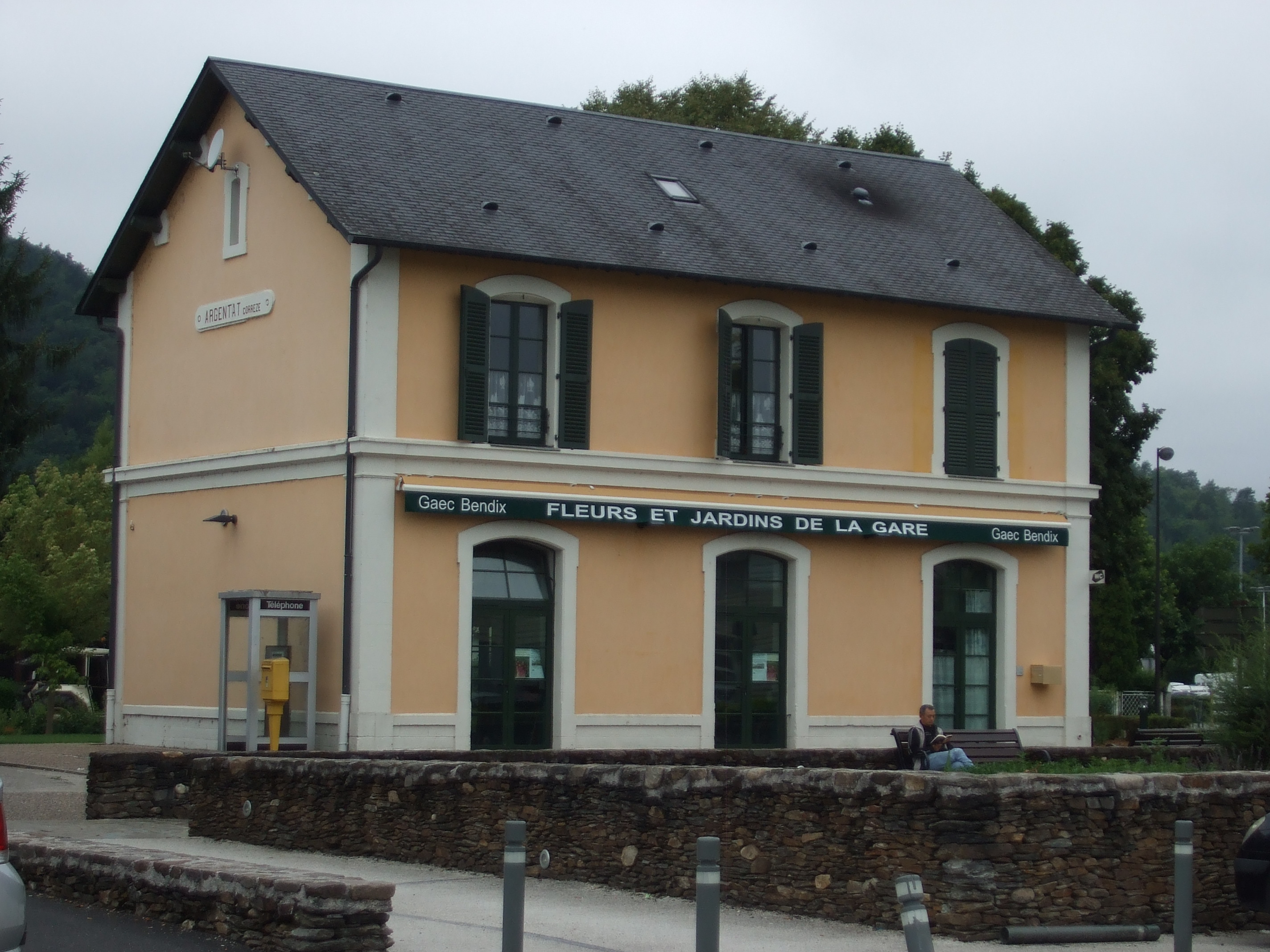
Old Railway Station

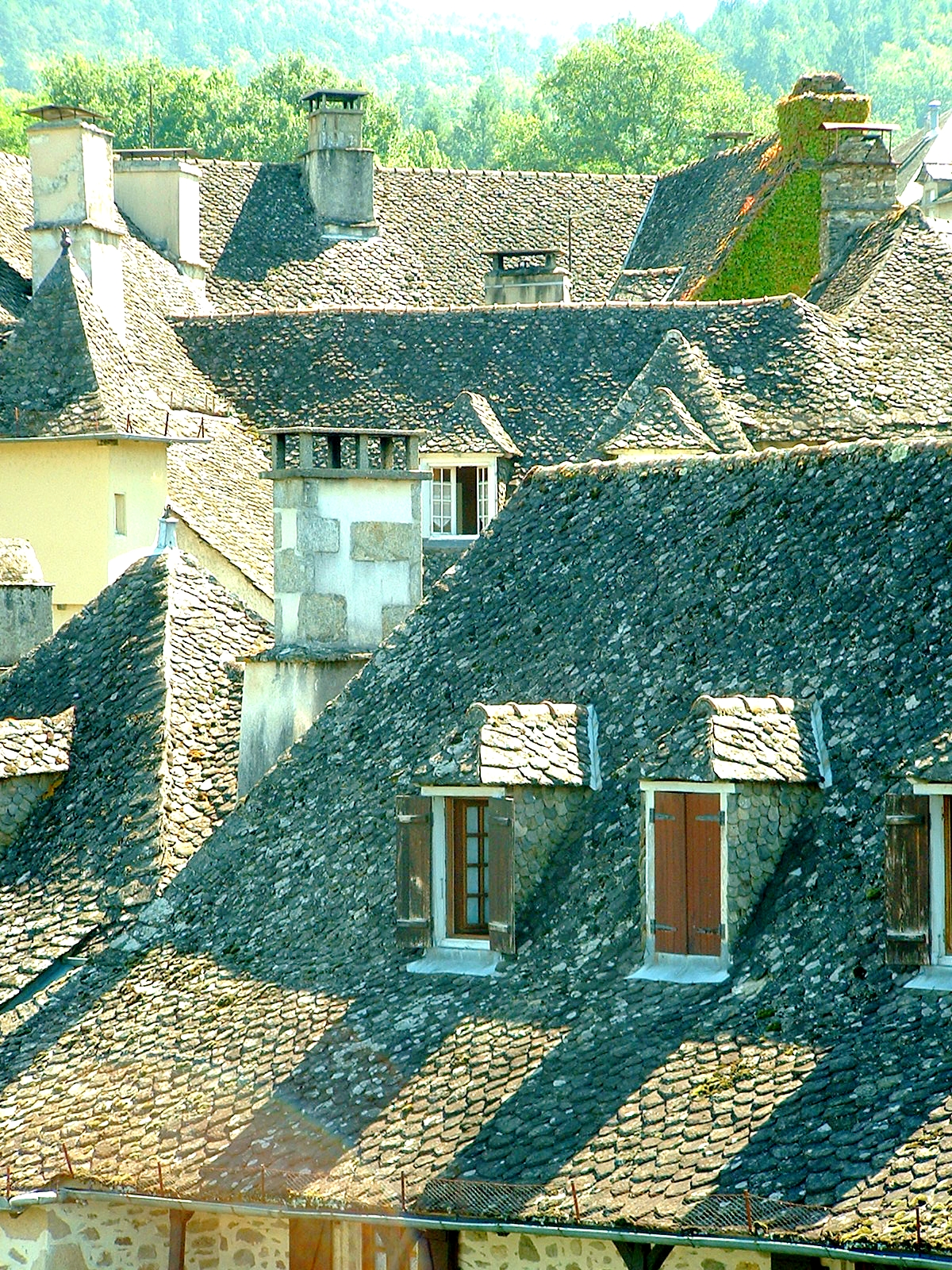
Stone roofs

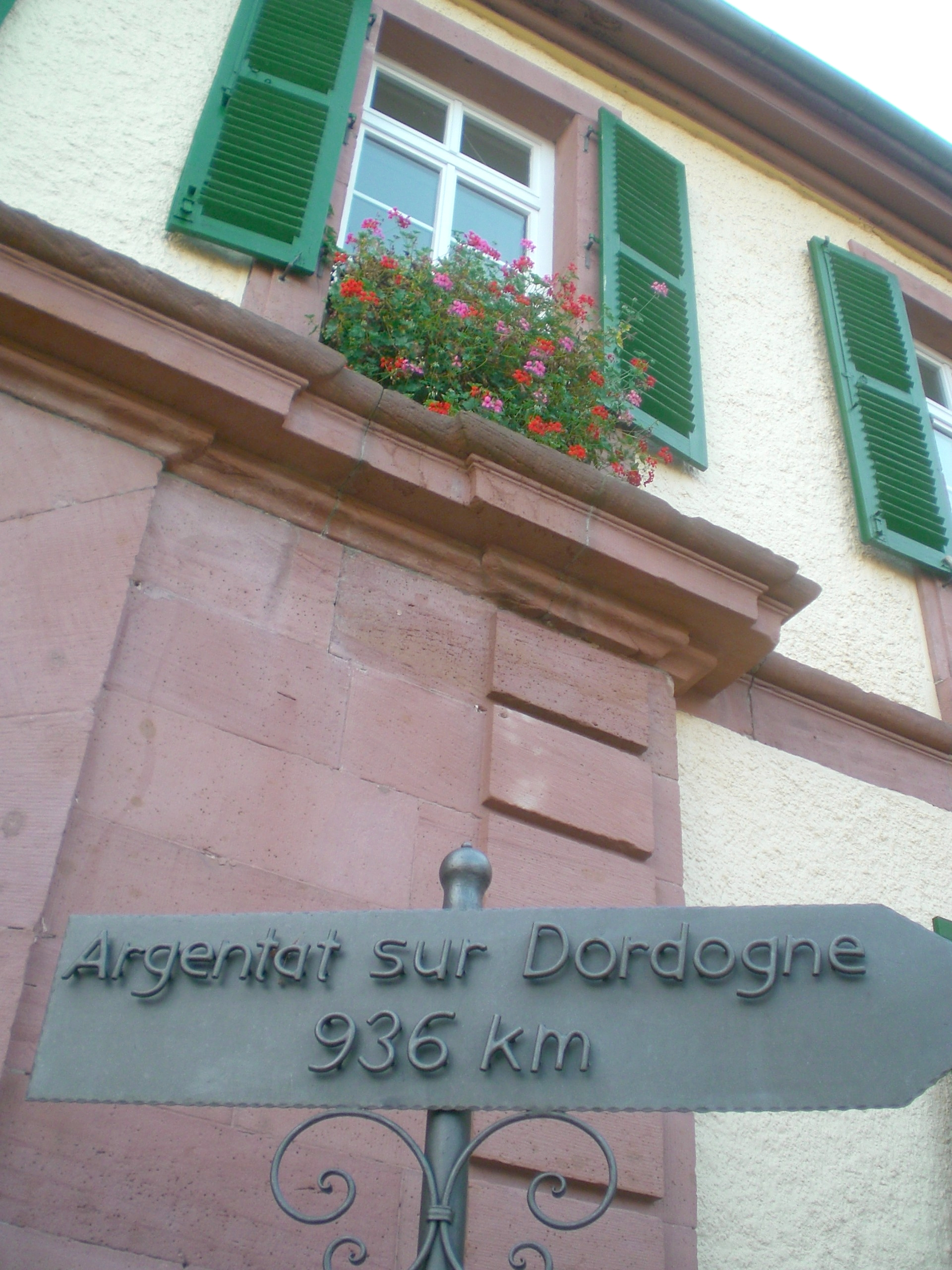
Sign in Bad König with distance to Argentat.

The Church of Saint Pierre

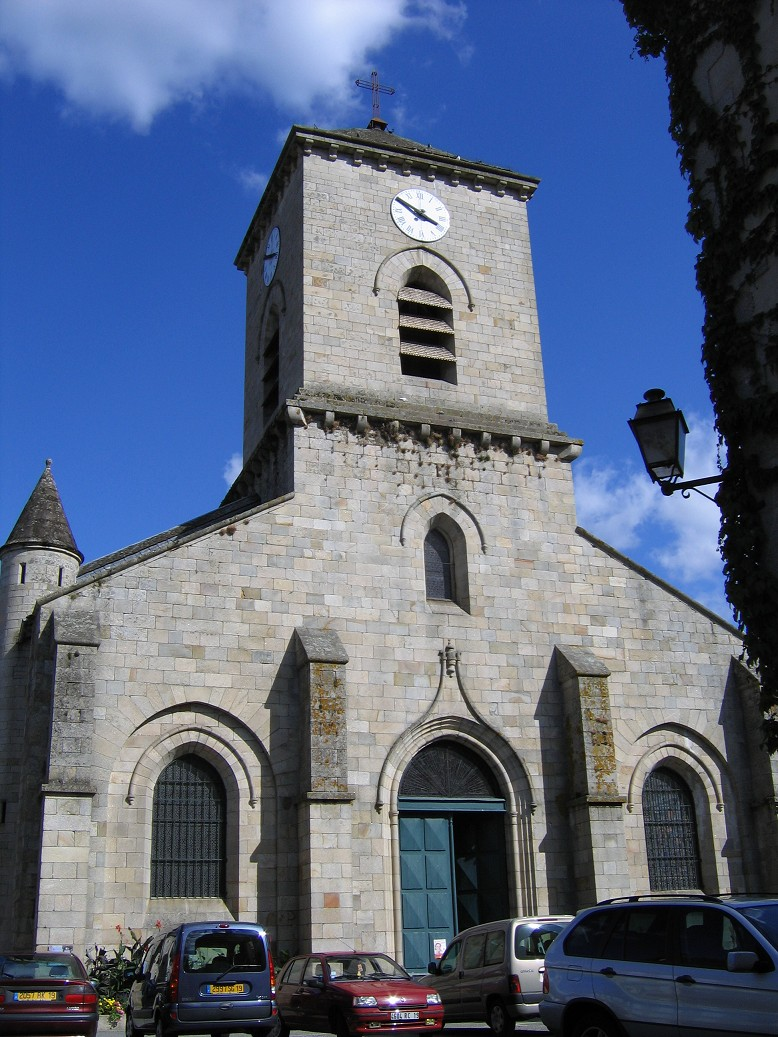

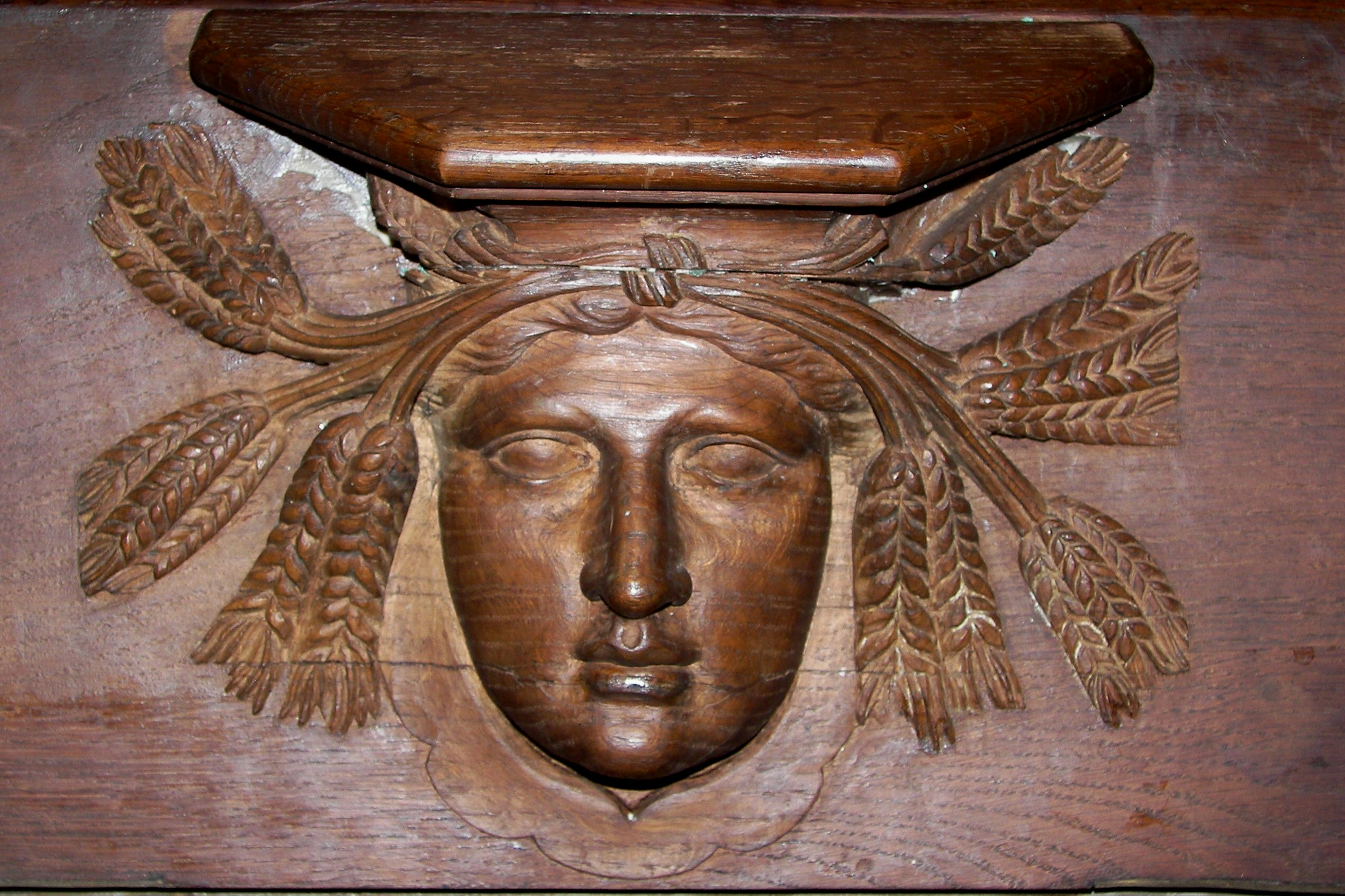

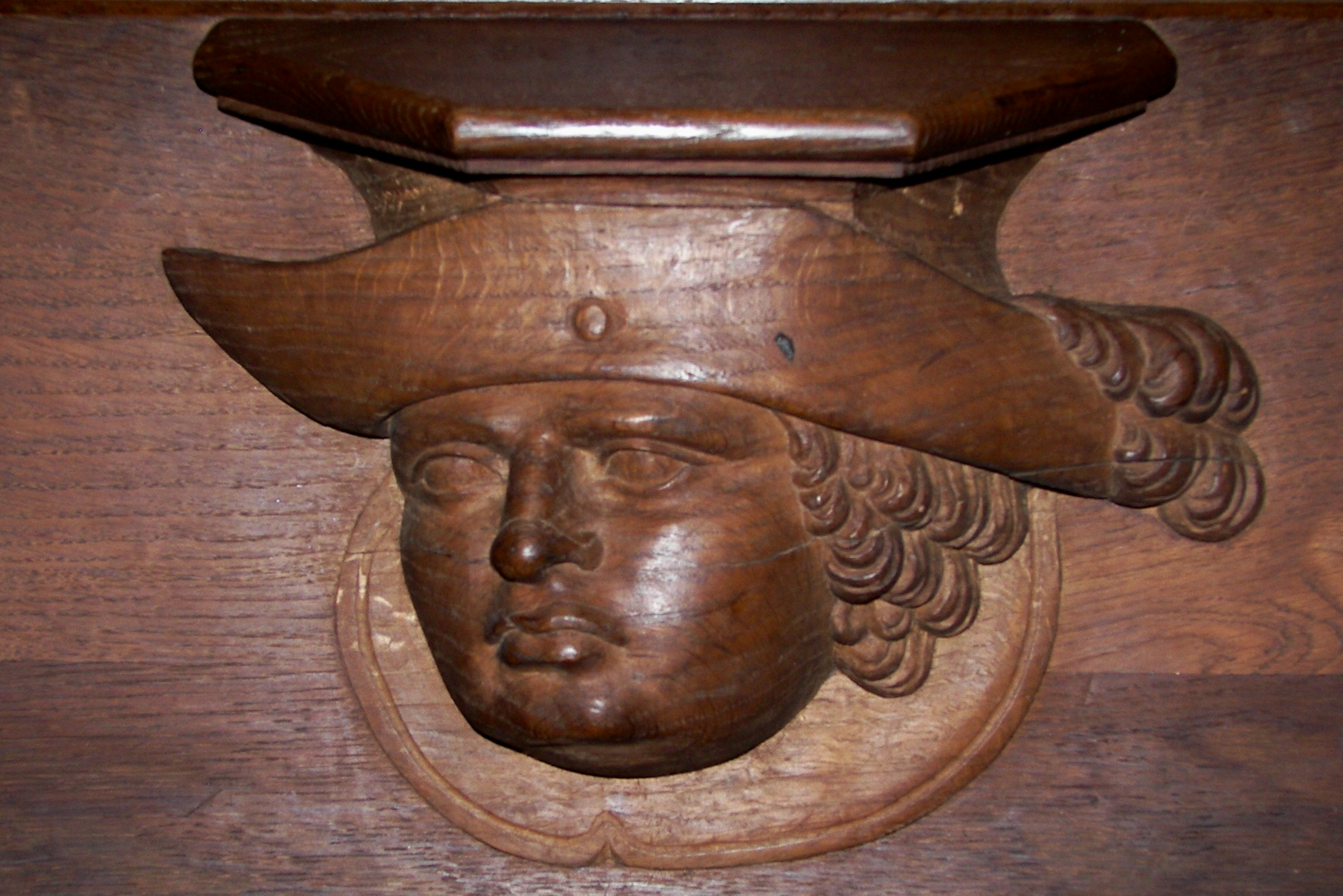

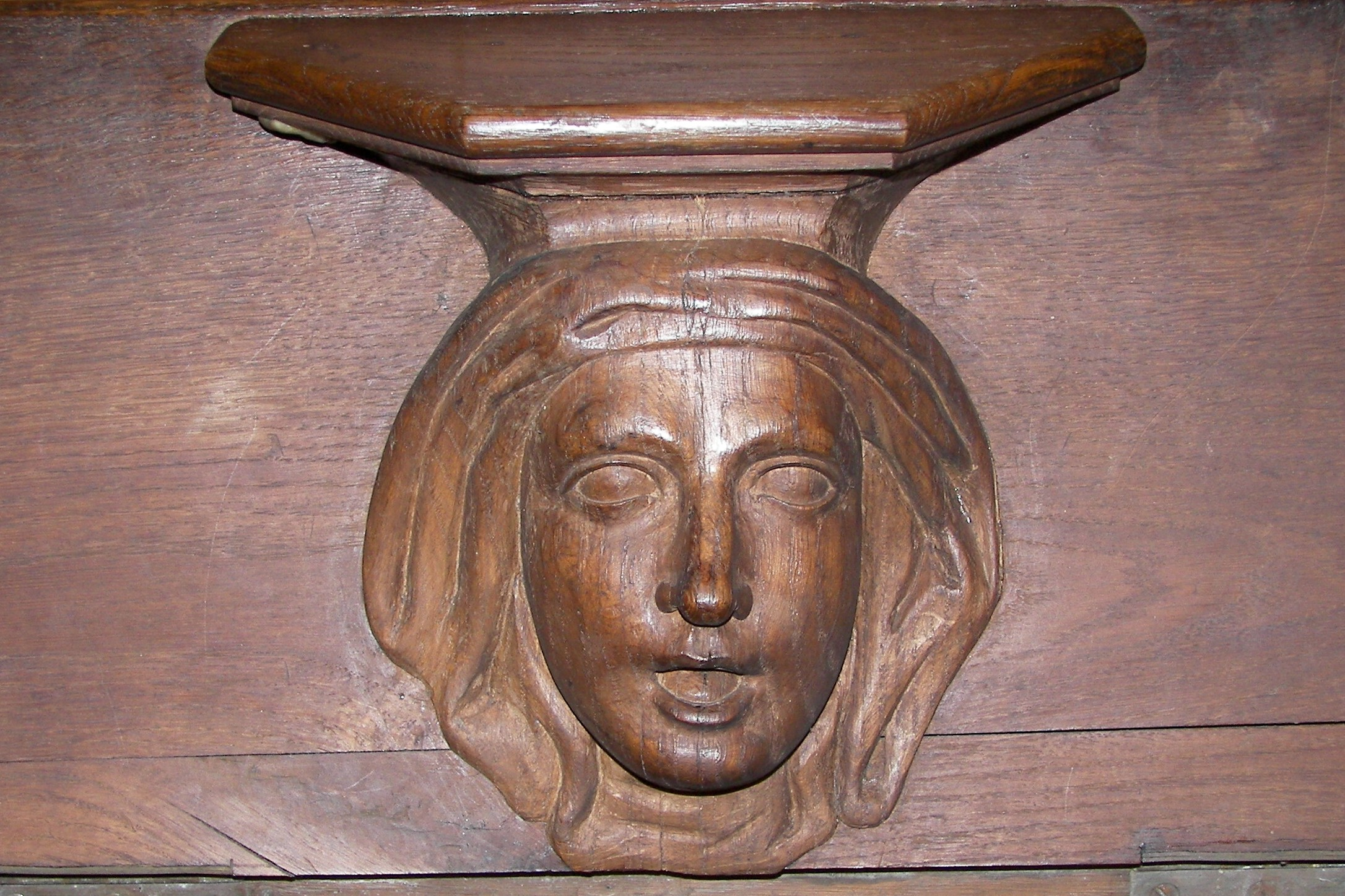

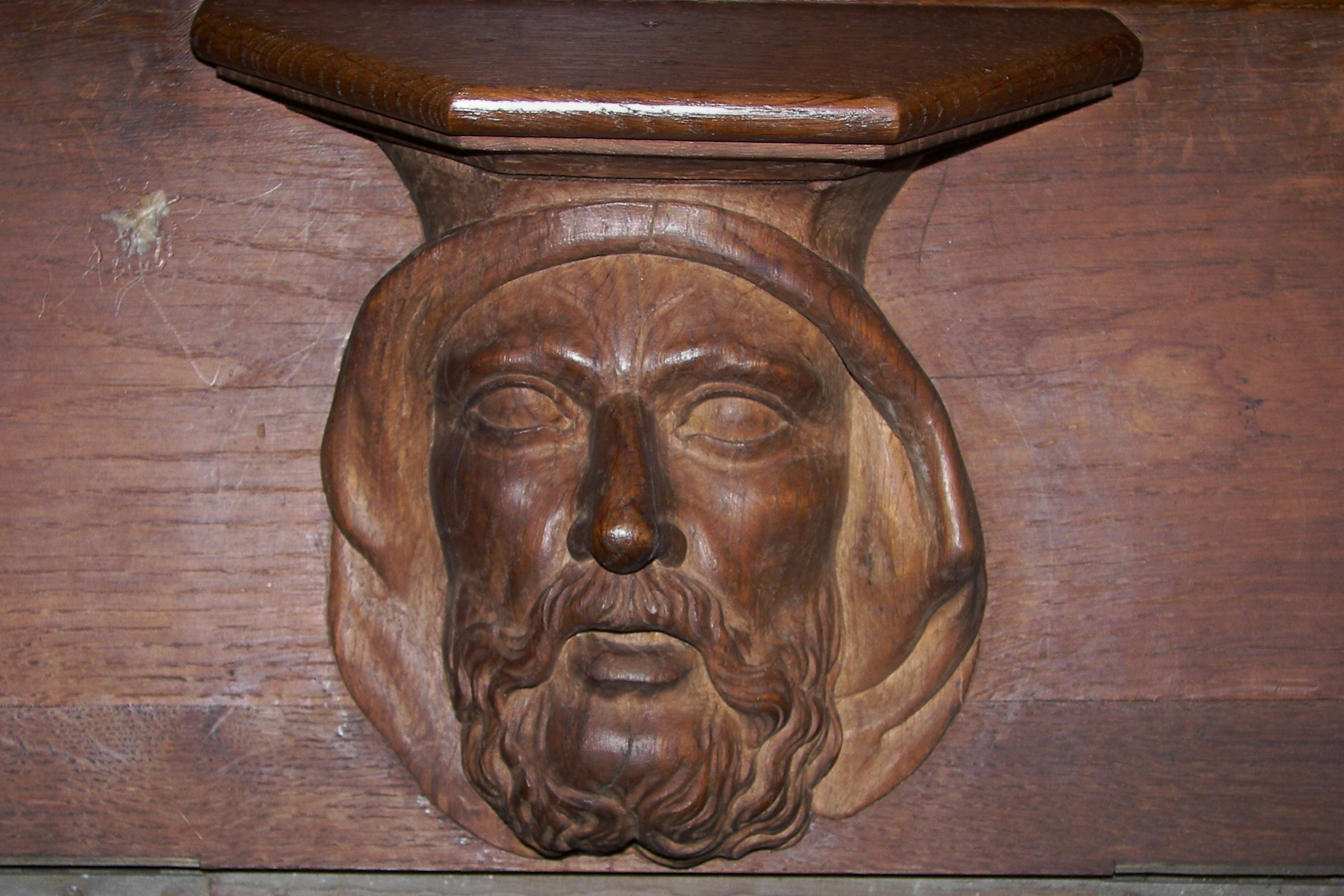

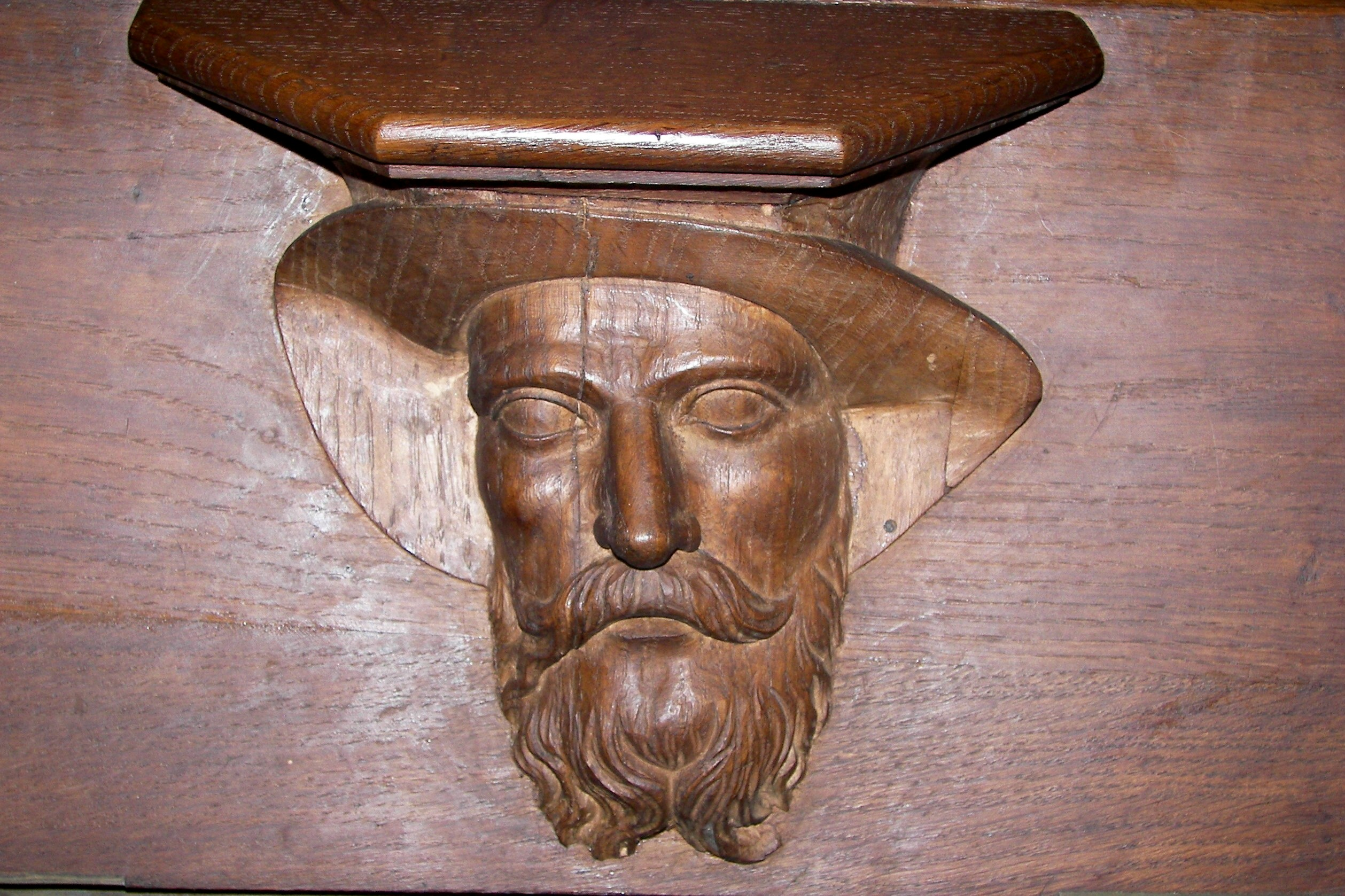

== See also ==
- Communes of the Corrèze department

=== Bibliography ===
- Jacques Patureau, The Coal Mines of Argentat, Tulle, Mille Sources, 2001. (in French)
- Eusèbe Bombal, Upper Dordogne and its boatmen, foreword by Henri Soudeille, illustrations by Simone Hymon, bio-bibliography by Daniel Borzeix, published by "Les Monedieres", 1981 (first edition 1903). (in French)
