= Argentat-sur-Dordogne =

- Commune
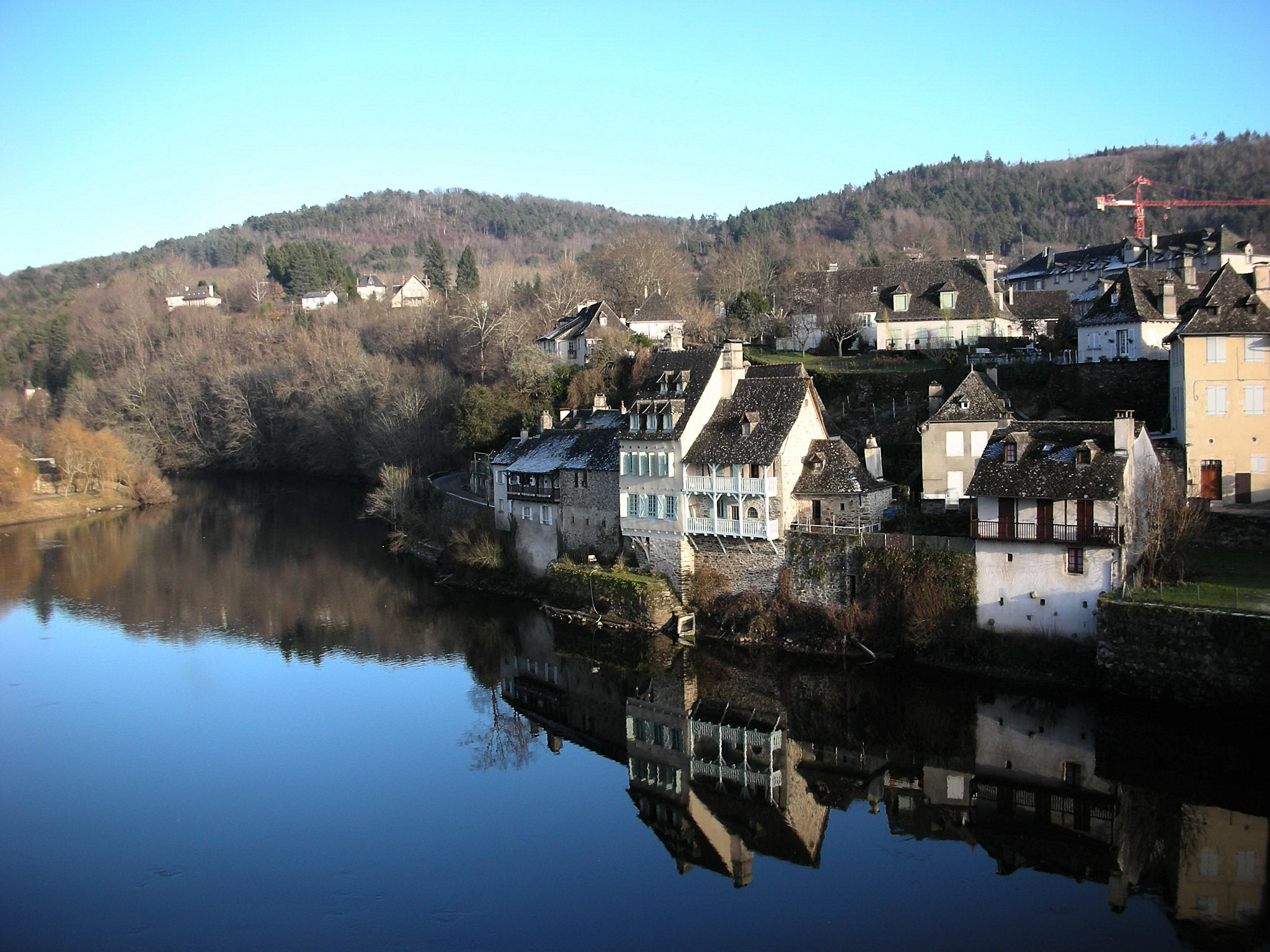
- Houses along the Dordogne river in Argentat
- Location of Argentat-sur-Dordogne
- Location within France Location within Nouvelle-Aquitaine
- Coordinates: 45°05′38″N 1°56′20″E
- Country: France
- Region: Nouvelle-Aquitaine
- Department: Corrèze
- Arrondissement: Tulle
- Canton: Argentat-sur-Dordogne
- Intercommunality: CC Xaintrie Val'Dordogne

Government
  - Mayor (2020–2026): Sébastien Duchamp
- Area^{1}: 29.57 km^{2} (11.42 sq mi)
- Population (2023): 2,881
  - Density: 97.43/km^{2} (252.3/sq mi)
- Time zone: UTC+01:00 (CET)
  - Summer (DST): UTC+02:00 (CEST)
- INSEE/Postal code: 19010 /19400
- ^{1} French Land Register data, which excludes lakes, ponds, glaciers > 1 km^{2} (0.386 sq mi or 247 acres) and river estuaries.

Argentat-sur-Dordogne (French pronunciation: [aʁʒɑ̃ta syʁ dɔʁdɔɲ], literally Argentat on Dordogne) is a commune in the department of Corrèze, south-central France. The municipality was established on 1 January 2017 by merger of the former communes of Argentat (the seat) and Saint-Bazile-de-la-Roche.

== Geography ==
=== Location ===
Located in the Massif Central, at the confluence of the Maronne with the Dordogne river, it is at the southern end of the Faille d'Argentat. To the east, the town is bordered by the Doustre, and to the west it is watered by the Souvigne..

The town of Argentat is situated on the edge of three regions, the Limousin, the Auvergne and the Quercy, on the Dordogne river after it has crossed deep gorges. Argentat is located in the western part of the Xaintrie in the small Bas-Limousin.

From this geographical situation arises the interest of the town: passage of the Dordogne on the one hand, and port for important river traffic towards Bergerac and Libourne.

== Population ==
Historical population
Year	Pop.	±% p.a.
1968	3,438	—
1975	3,567	+0.53%
1982	3,411	−0.64%
1990	3,364	−0.17%
1999	3,276	−0.29%
2007	3,268	−0.03%
2012	3,133	−0.84%
2017	3,016	−0.76%
2023	2,881	−0.76%
Source: INSEE

== Local culture and heritage ==
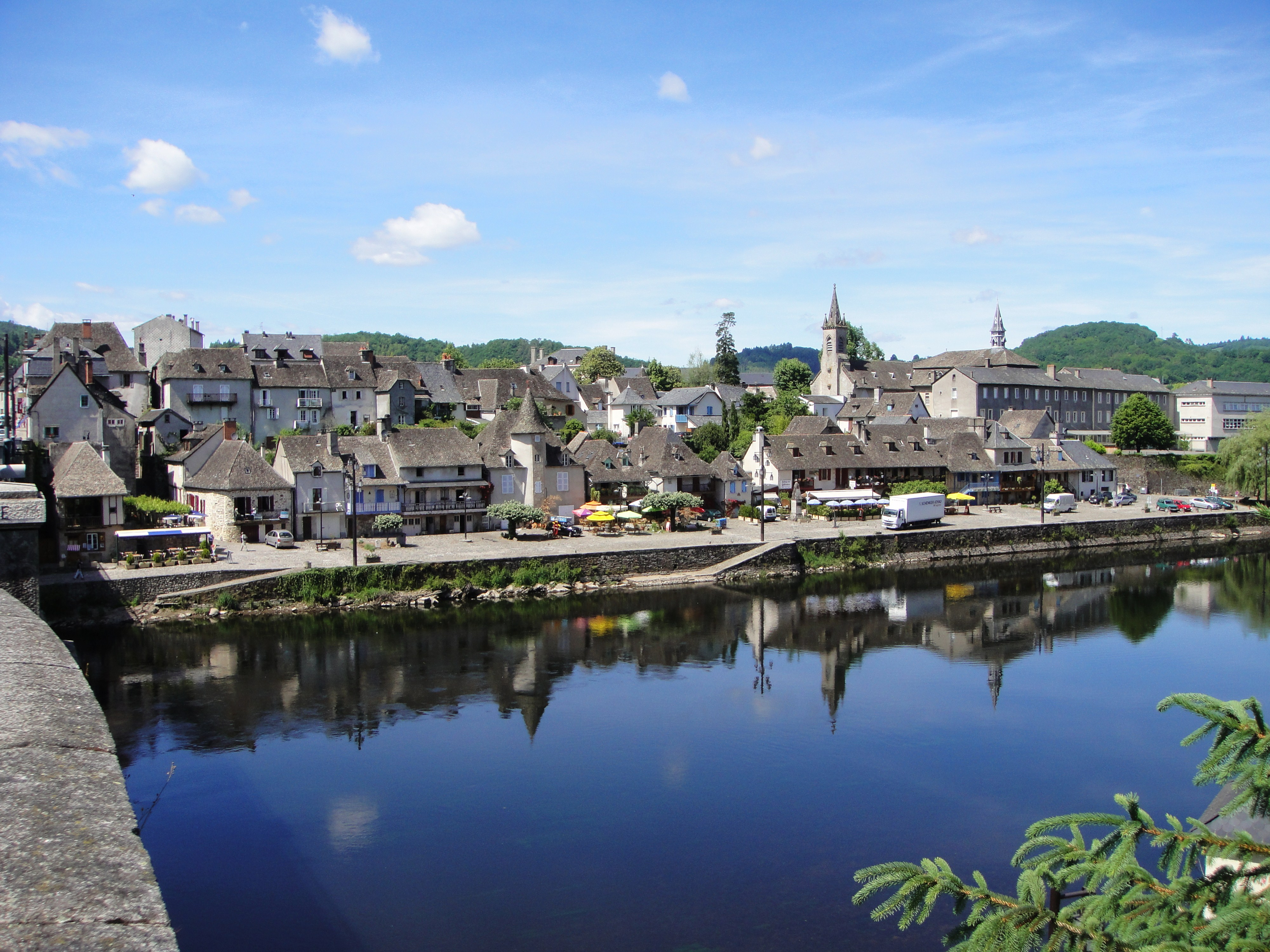
Argentat and old quay

- La Maison du Patrimoine.
- St. Peter's Church.
- The convent of the Récollets, founded in the early seventeenth century.
- The Cross of the Gabariers (bargemen).
- The Quai Maçonné Lestourgie - 19th century quay (1844) with a nice promenade, on the right bank of the Dordogne.
- The Clarisses Convent, 7 Rue des Clarisses.
- L'hôtel de Turenne, la " Raymondie ", 13 Rue des Clarisses.
- The Chapel built at the end of the 19th century, Rue des Clarisses.
- The rue Porte-Basse.
- The house where General Antoine Guillaume Delmas was born and his bust (1906) by Eugène-Jean Boverie.
- La Maison Filliol (16th century), former relay post
- Le Manoir de Eyrial (1457).
- Château Neuville, also known as Château Fénelon,.
- Le Château du Bac: 18th century façade, 16th century dovecote.
- La Chapelle-aux-Plats, a former parish merged with the commune Argentat. His castle belonged to a branch of the Pestels family.
- The Barrage d'Argentat {dam} and the Château du Gibanel
- Bridge over the Maronne river

== See also ==
- Communes of the Corrèze department
