= Saint-Privat, Corrèze =

Saint-Privat
- Commune
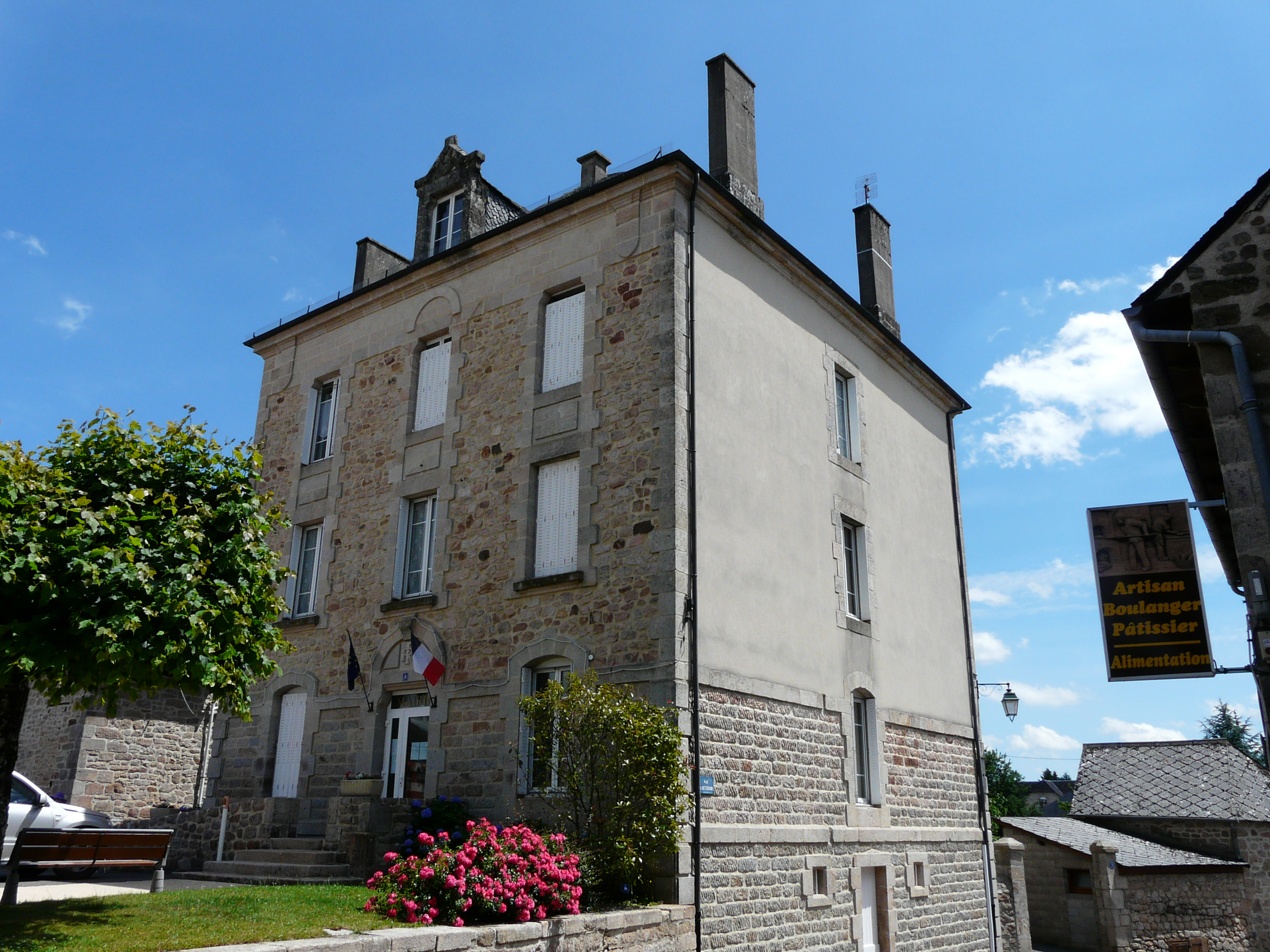
- Town hall

- Coat of arms
- Location of Saint-Privat
- Location within France Location within Nouvelle-Aquitaine
- Coordinates: 45°08′20″N 2°05′59″E
- Country: France
- Region: Nouvelle-Aquitaine
- Department: Corrèze
- Arrondissement: Tulle
- Canton: Argentat-sur-Dordogne

Government
  - Mayor (2020–2026): Jean-Basile Sallard
- Area^{1}: 32.85 km^{2} (12.68 sq mi)
- Elevation: 580 m (1,900 ft)
- Highest elevation: 623 m (2,044 ft)
- Lowest elevation: 491 m (1,611 ft)
- Population (2023): 1,034
  - Density: 31.48/km^{2} (81.52/sq mi)
- Time zone: UTC+01:00 (CET)
  - Summer (DST): UTC+02:00 (CEST)
- INSEE/Postal code: 19237 /19220
- ^{1} French Land Register data, which excludes lakes, ponds, glaciers > 1 km^{2} (0.386 sq mi or 247 acres) and river estuaries.

Saint-Privat (French pronunciation: [sɛ̃ pʁiva]; Occitan: Sent Privat) is a commune in the Corrèze department in central France.

== History ==
In 887, a man called Hugues, donate his church in Betugum, dedicated to Saint Privat, to the Abbey of Beaulieu. A variation of the name Betugum written as Besug, is recorded in land records around the church but by 1190, the village is known by its current name.

During the French Revolution, following a decree of the National Convention, the commune changed its name to Privat-Haute-Montagne and Privat-le-Centre.

In 1884, a great fire destroyed most of the buildings in the town.

== Population ==
Historical population
Year	Pop.	±% p.a.
1968	1,019	—
1975	1,114	+1.28%
1982	1,167	+0.67%
1990	1,126	−0.45%
1999	1,091	−0.35%
2007	1,115	+0.27%
2012	1,095	−0.36%
2017	1,075	−0.37%
2023	1,034	−0.65%
Source: INSEE

== Local culture and heritage ==
=== Places and monuments ===
- L'église Saint-Privat - A church from the 1400s. On the western side of the church is a square tower, side chapels from the 1500s and the church features a 1600s sculptured panel representing The Last Supper, and on the vaults, the coats of arms of the Noailles family;
- The Chemin de Vijus - starts in the centre of Saint-Privat, near the school, and goes around Puy-Bertrand and ends on the road to Malesse.
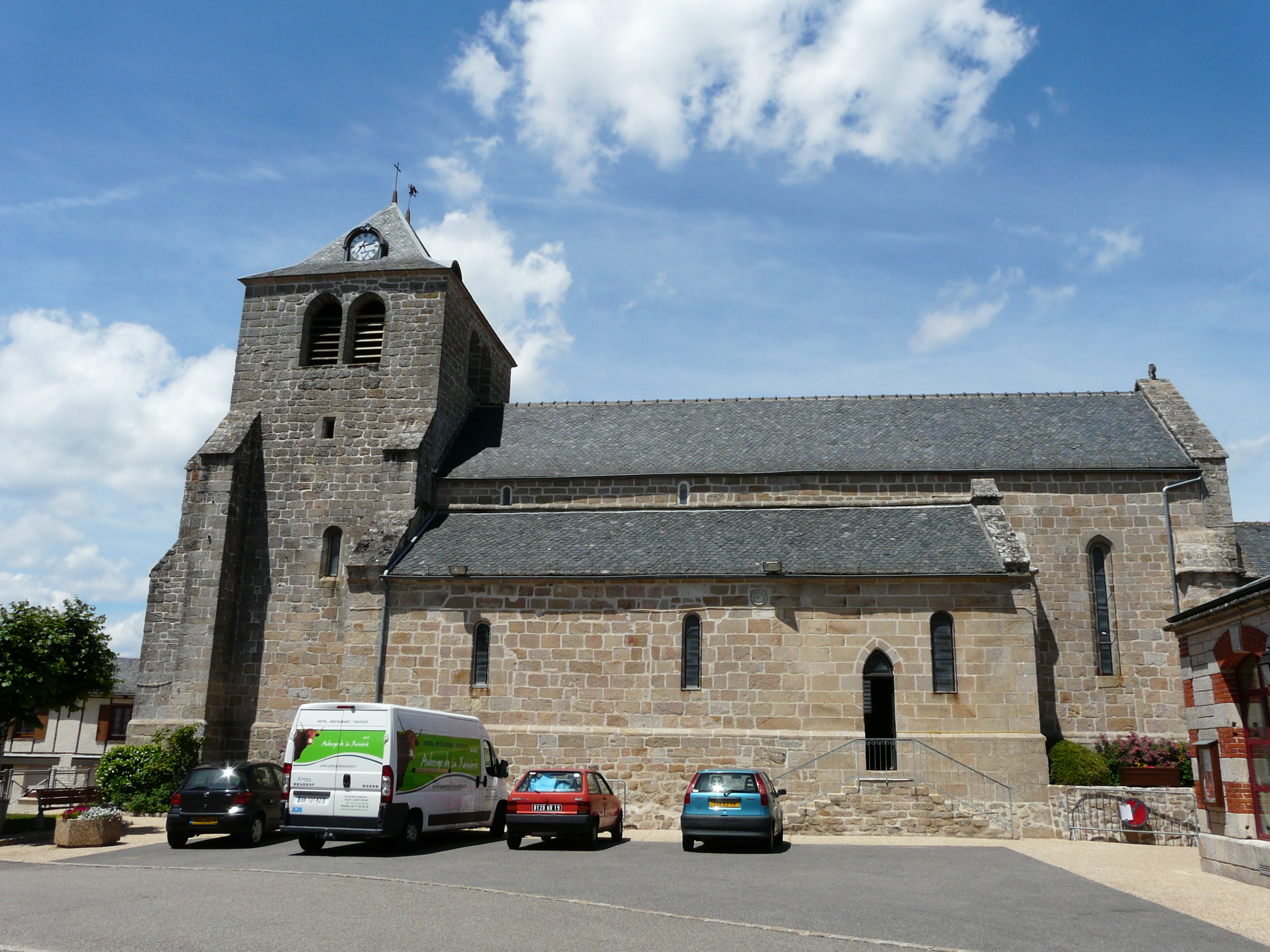
Church of Saint-Privat

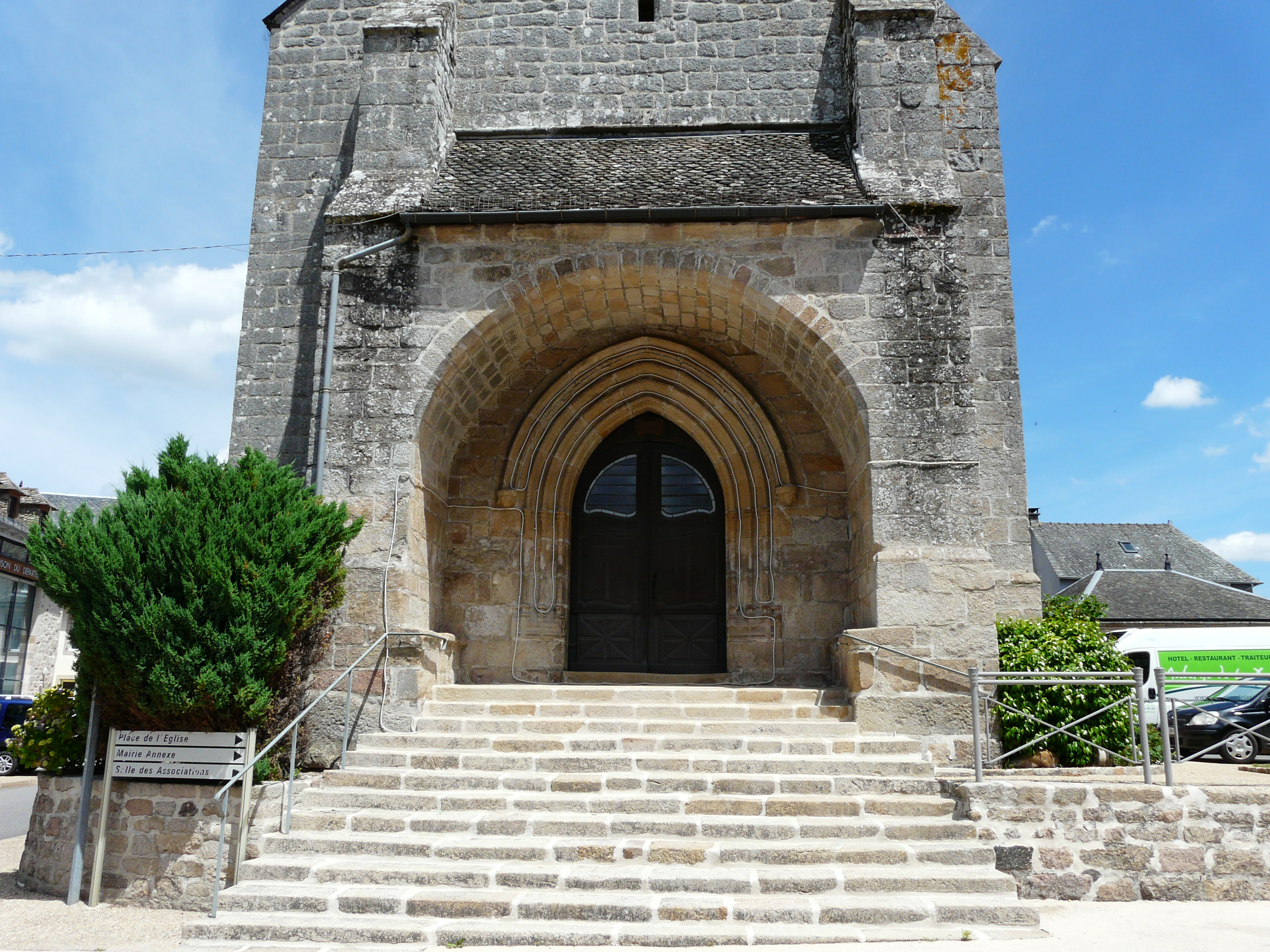
Its porch

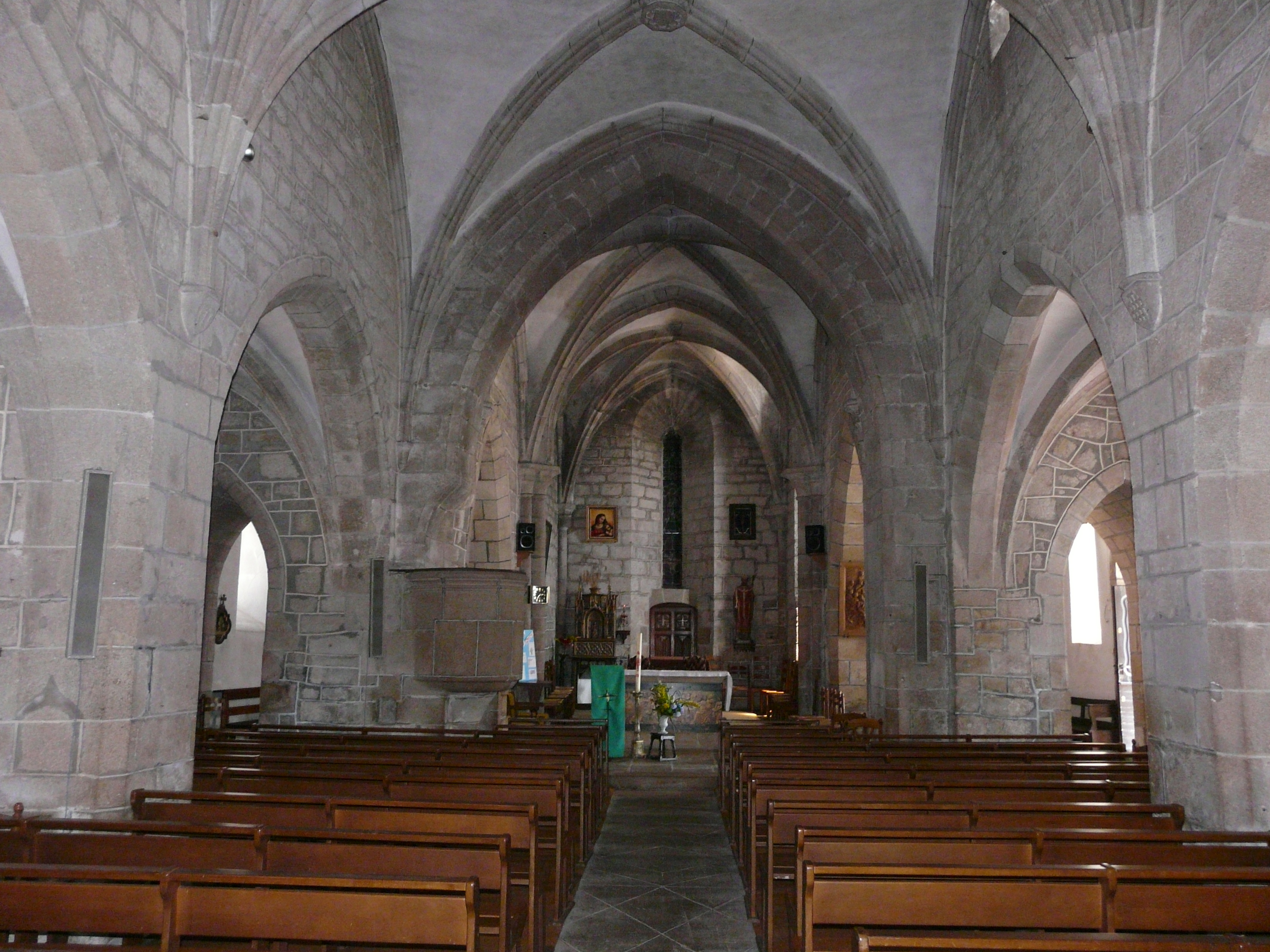
Its nave

== See also ==
- Communes of the Corrèze department
