= Saint-Bazile-de-la-Roche =

- Part of Argentat-sur-Dordogne
- Coat of arms
- Location of Saint-Bazile-de-la-Roche
- Location within France Location within Nouvelle-Aquitaine
- Coordinates: 45°09′09″N 1°57′14″E
- Country: France
- Region: Nouvelle-Aquitaine
- Department: Corrèze
- Arrondissement: Tulle
- Canton: Sainte-Fortunade
- Commune: Argentat-sur-Dordogne
- Area^{1}: 7.16 km^{2} (2.76 sq mi)
- Highest elevation: 532 m (1,745 ft)
- Lowest elevation: 210 m (690 ft)
- Population (2023): 138
  - Density: 19.3/km^{2} (49.9/sq mi)
- Time zone: UTC+01:00 (CET)
  - Summer (DST): UTC+02:00 (CEST)
- Postal code: 19320
- ^{1} French Land Register data, which excludes lakes, ponds, glaciers > 1 km^{2} (0.386 sq mi or 247 acres) and river estuaries.

Saint-Bazile-de-la-Roche (French pronunciation: [sɛ̃ bazil də la ʁɔʃ]; Limousin: Sent Bausilha de la Ròcha) is a former commune in the Corrèze department in central France. On 1 January 2017, it was merged into the new commune Argentat-sur-Dordogne.

== See also ==
- Communes of the Corrèze department
