= Antoine Guillaume Delmas =

French military officer

Antoine-Guillaume Maurailhac Delmas de La Coste Delmas
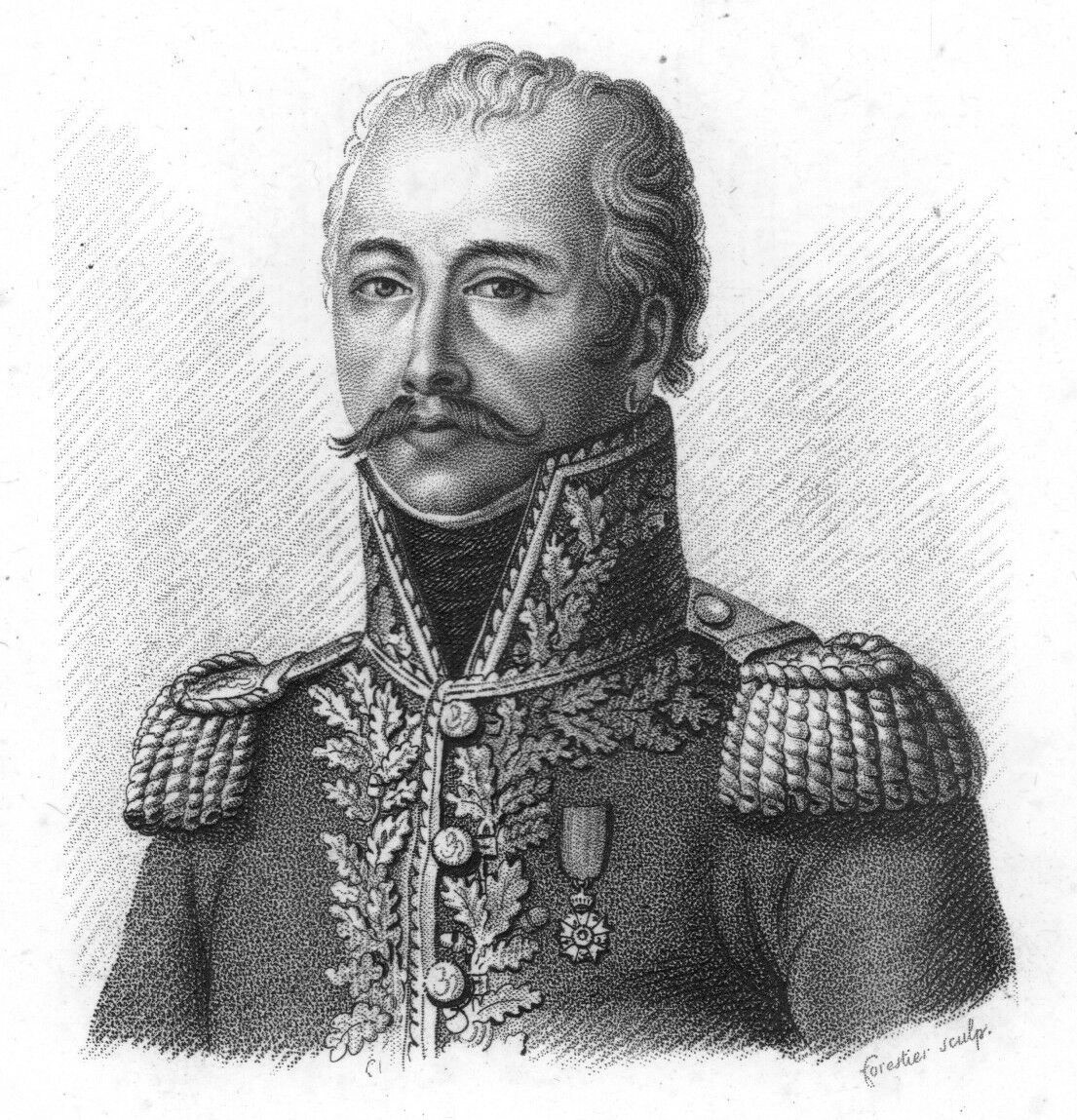
- Antoine Guillaume Delmas
- Born: 3 January 1766; Argentat, Kingdom of France
- Died: 30 October 1813 (aged 47); Leipzig, Kingdom of Saxony
- Military career
- Allegiance: Kingdom of France; First French Republic; First French Empire
- Branch: Army
- Service years: 1781 – 1813
- Rank: General of division
- Conflicts: French Revolutionary Wars; Siege of Landau; Battle of Kaiserslautern; Battle of Boxtel; Siege of Nijmegen; Crossing of the Rhine; Battle of Rastadt; Battle of Neresheim; Battle of Verona; Battle of Magnano; Battle of Engen; Battle of Messkirch; Battle of Pozzolo; Napoleonic Wars; Battle of Bautzen; Battle of the Katzbach; Battle of Leipzig (DOW)
- Memorials: Name inscribed on the Arc de Triomphe, Paris

Antoine-Guillaume Maurailhac Delmas de La Coste Delmas (French pronunciation: [ɑ̃twan ɡijom mɔʁajak dɛlmɑ də la kɔst dɛlmɑ]; 3 January 1766 – 30 October 1813) was a French military officer who served in the French Revolutionary Wars and Napoleonic Wars. Delmas was killed at the Battle of Leipzig.

Delmas was born in Argentat in the Kingdom of France on 3 January 1766. He was wounded at the Battle of Leipzig and later died on 30 October 1813 in Leipzig.

His name is inscribed on the east pillar of the Arc de Triomphe.

== Early Military Experiences ==
In 1781, Delmas became a gentleman cadet in the Touraine infantry regiment. He was commissioned as a sous-lieutenant three years later before being promoted to a lieutenant in 1787. Delmas was dismissed from the regiment for insubordination in 1788.

By June 1791, Delmas was a lieutenant in the gendarmerie of his home département of Corrèze. In September of that year he volunteered for the army, becoming a lieutenant colonel of the 1st Battalion of Volunteers of Corrèze.

== The Revolutionary Wars ==
In June 1793 Delmas was promoted to Général De Brigade in the Army of the Rhine. After participating in the Siege of Landau, Delmas was arrested by a representative of the people, yet was released shortly after.

Delmas was placed in charge of the 3rd Division of the Army of the Rhine in January 1794. In May, Delmas saw action at Schifferstadt during the Battle of Kaiserslautern. Delmas was again arrested on 10 June before being released shortly after. After his release, Delmas was transferred to the Army of the North and given command of its 6th Division. Between September and November 1794 he participated in the Siege of Bois-le-Duc and the Siege of Nijmegen. In October 1795 Delmas was transferred to the Army of the Rhine and Moselle. Joining Desaix's corps of the center, he saw much action in the following months, serving at the crossing of the Rhine, Rastadt, and Neresheim.

In January 1797, Delmas marched his division to join the Army of Italy. In March 1797 he was placed under the command of General Joubert. In April of that year Delmas singled out by General Napoleon Bonaparte and rebuked for beating his troops with his cane. Delmas saw combat in 1799 at Pastrengo during the Battle of Verona and at the Battle of Magnano. Following these battles, Delmas was sent back to the Army of the Rhine.

With the Army of the Rhine, Delmas commanded the 7th Division of the right wing of the army, serving under Lecourbe. For a short time he was in charge of the 6th Division, and then in April he was placed in command of the 1st Division of the Reserve Corps of the Army of Rhine. Delmas fought at the Battles of Engen and Messkirch with this division until replaced by General Grandjean. Transferred back to Italy, he served under General Brune, distinguishing himself at the Battle of Pozzolo, seizing the redoubts at Salionze, and assisting in the attack on Verona.

In April 1801 he commanded a division of Piedmont but was relieved of command after his troops mutinied. Delmas was given the position of Inspector General of Infantry but his attitudes got him into trouble yet again. In May 1802 he was exiled from Paris, ordered to stay at least 30 miles from the city for his opinions on the Concordat with the Pope. Two years later, in 1804, he was arrested at the time of Moreau's trial and he was exiled to Porrentruy until 1813.

== The Napoleonic Wars ==
After the Russian campaign of 1812, there was a need for experienced officers and Delmas requested and was returned to active duty. Taking command of the 9th Division of Ney's III Corps, he led the division into combat at the Battle of Bautzen. He later fought at the Battle of the Katzbach and then the Battle of Leipzig. During the Battle of Leipzig a cannonball struck him in the right hip and he was taken to the hospital, dying of his wounds two weeks later.

== Notes ==
=== Sources ===
- Jensen, Nathan D. (2013). "General Antoine-Guillaume Maurailhac Delmas de La Coste Delmas". arcdetriomphe.info.
- Six, Georges (1934). "Delmas (Antoine-Guillaume-Maurailhac Delmas de La Coste, dit)". Dictionnaire biographique des généraux et amiraux français de la Révolution et de l'Empire: 1792–1814 (in French). Vol. 1. Paris: Librairie Historique et Nobilaire. p. 320.
