= Corrèze's 1st constituency =

Constituency of the National Assembly of France

1st constituency of the Corrèze
- inline Constituency of the National Assembly of France

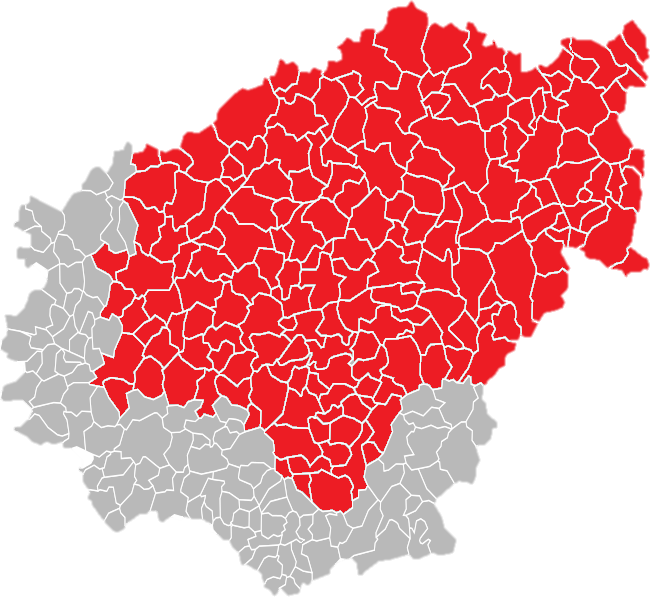
- Constituency in department

- Corrèze in France
- Deputy: François Hollande; PS
- Department: Corrèze
- Cantons: (pre-2015) Argentat, Bort-les-Orgues, Bugeat, Corrèze, Donzenac, Égletons, Eygurande, Lapleau, Meymac, Neuvic, La Roche-Canillac, Seilhac, Sornac, Treignac, Tulle-Campagne-Nord, Tulle-Campagne-Sud, Tulle-Urbain-Nord, Tulle-Urbain-Sud, Ussel-Est, Ussel-Ouest, Uzerche, Vigeois
- Registered voters: 121,830

The 1st constituency of the Corrèze is one of two French legislative constituencies in the Corrèze department (Limousin). There were three constituencies in the department until the 2010 redistricting of French legislative constituencies.

Following that redistricting, it consists of the following (pre-2015) cantons : Argentat, Bort-les-Orgues, Bugeat, Corrèze, Donzenac, Égletons, Eygurande, Lapleau, Meymac, Neuvic, La Roche-Canillac, Seilhac, Sornac, Treignac, Tulle-Campagne-Nord, Tulle-Campagne-Sud, Tulle-Urbain-Nord, Tulle-Urbain-Sud, Ussel-Est, Ussel-Ouest, Uzerche, Vigeois.

== Deputies ==
Election	Member	Party
1958	Jean Montalat	SFIO
1962	Jean Montalat	SFIO
1967	Jean Montalat	FGDS
1968	Jean Montalat	FGDS
1973	Pierre Pranchère	PCF
1978	Jean-Pierre Bechter	RPR
1981	Jean Combasteil	PCF
1986	Proportional representation - no election by constituency	
1988	François Hollande	PS
1993	Raymond-Max Aubert	RPR
1997	François Hollande	PS
2002	François Hollande	PS
2007	François Hollande	PS
2012	Sophie Dessus	PS
2016	Alain Ballay	PS
2017	Christophe Jerretie	LREM
2020	Christophe Jerretie	MoDem
2022	Francis Dubois	LR
2024	François Hollande	PS

== Election results ==
=== 2024 ===
Candidate	Party	Alliance	First round			Second round		
Candidate	Party	Alliance	Votes	%	+/–	Votes	%	+/–
François Hollande	PS	NFP	24,720	37.63	+12.23	28,751	43.10	-3.10
Maïtey Pouget	RN		20,298	30.89	+15.76	21,141	31.69	new
Francis Dubois	LR	UDC	18,816	28.64	-8.02	16,821	25.21	-28.59
Marie-Thérèse Coinaud	LO		1,303	1.98	+0.91			
Gilles Oguinena	REC		563	0.86	-2.21			
Votes			65,700	100.00		66,713	100.00	
Valid votes			65,700	95.91	-0.99	66,713	96.71	+5.75
Blank votes			1,563	2.28	+0.34	1,317	1.91	-3.42
Null votes			1,242	1.81	+0.65	951	1.38	-2.32
Turnout			68,505	74.67	+16.33	68,981	75.18	+18.09
Abstentions			23,242	25.33	-16.33	22,772	24.82	-18.09
Registered voters			91,747			91,753		
Result			PS GAIN FROM LR					

=== 2022 ===
Legislative Election 2022: Corrèze's 1st constituency
Party	Candidate	Votes	%	±%
LFI (NUPÉS)	Sandrine Deveaud	13,271	25.40	-13.92
LR (UDC)	Francis Dubois	10,772	20.62	+5.43
MoDem (Ensemble)	Christophe Jerretie	10,095	19.32	−13.19
RN	Maitey Pouget	7,905	15.13	+6.07
PS	Annick Taysse*	5,201	9.96	N/A
LMR	Amélie Rebiere	1,661	3.18	N/A
REC	Gilles Oguinena	1,603	3.07	N/A
Others	N/A	1,737	3.32	
Turnout		52,245	58.34	−1.75
2nd round result
LR (UDC)	Francis Dubois	25,825	53.80	N/A
LFI (NUPÉS)	Sandrine Deveaud	22,173	46.20	−0.37
Turnout		47,998	57.09	+3.94
LR gain from LREM				

* PS dissident

=== 2017 ===
Candidate	Label	First round		Second round	
Candidate	Label	Votes	%	Votes	%
Christophe Jerretie	REM	17,534	32.51	22,509	53.43
Bernard Combes	PS	9,666	17.92	19,619	46.57
Françoise Béziat	LR	8,194	15.19		
Jean-Marc Vareille	FI	6,240	11.57		
Agnès Tarraso	FN	4,884	9.06		
Jean Mouzat	PCF	4,203	7.79		
Mumine Ozsoy	ECO	1,100	2.04		
Antoine Behr	DLF	853	1.58		
Alain Cruzel	ECO	572	1.06		
Marie-Thérèse Coinaud	EXG	321	0.60		
Anne-Pascale Chabot	DIV	311	0.58		
Alex-William Fernandez	DIV	58	0.11		
Votes		53,936	100.00	42,128	100.00
Valid votes		53,936	96.88	42,128	85.56
Blank votes		1,115	2.00	4,201	8.53
Null votes		621	1.12	2,908	5.91
Turnout		55,672	60.09	49,237	53.15
Abstentions		36,976	39.91	43,406	46.85
Registered voters		92,648		92,643	
Source: Ministry of the Interior

=== 2012 ===
Sophie Dessus was elected deputy. She died in office on 3 March 2016, and was replaced by her substitute Alain Ballay the following day.

2012 legislative election: Corrèze's 1st constituency - 1st round
Party	Candidate	Votes	%	±%
PS	Sophie Dessus	33,247	51.45	
UMP	Michel Paillasou	17,875	27.66	
FG	Christian Audouin	6,695	10.36	
FN	Nicole Daccord	4,501	6.96	
EELV	Eve Aldridge	963	1.49	
NM	Michele Mounier	588	0.91	
DVE	Alain Cruzel	338	0.52	
EXG	Marie-Thérèse Coinaud	265	0.41	
DVE	Didier Poyer	155	0.24	
Turnout		65,881	65.69	
PS hold		Swing		

=== 2007 ===
Legislative Election 2007: Corrèze's 1st constituency
Party	Candidate	Votes	%	±%
PS	François Hollande	20,879	44.38	
UMP	Jean-Pierre Decaie	16,219	34.48	
PCF	Dominique Grador	3,315	7.05	
MoDem	Michel Lagrave	2,245	4.77	
Others	N/A		4,387	
Turnout		48,126	72.96	
2nd round result
PS	François Hollande	28,470	60.25	
UMP	Jean-Pierre Decaie	18,784	39.75	
Turnout		48,881	74.12	
PS hold				

=== 2002 ===
Legislative Election 2002: Corrèze's 1st constituency
Party	Candidate	Votes	%	±%
UMP	Jean-Pierre Decaie	20,360	40.87	
PS	François Hollande	19,684	39.51	
PCF	Dominique Grador	3,560	7.15	
FN	Bernard Pinato	1,814	3.64	
CPNT	Pierre Vinatier	1,413	2.84	
Others	N/A	2,991		
Turnout		51,090	78.02	
2nd round result
PS	François Hollande	26,661	52.92	
UMP	Jean-Pierre Decaie	23,717	47.08	
Turnout		51,956	79.36	
PS hold				

=== 1997 ===
Legislative Election 1997: Corrèze's 1st constituency
Party	Candidate	Votes	%	±%
RPR	Raymond-Max Aubert	17,985	38.27	
PS	François Hollande	16,639	35.40	
PCF	Dominique Grador	8,556	18.20	
FN	Claude Dambrin	2,781	5.92	
MRC	Jean Chatenet	1,039	2.21	
Turnout		50,324	77.90	
2nd round result
PS	François Hollande	27,472	54.52	
RPR	Raymond-Max Aubert	22,913	45.48	
Turnout		53,221	82.44	
PS gain from RPR				

== Sources ==
- Notes and portraits of the French MPs under the Fifth Republic, French National Assembly
- 2007 results in the Corrèze's 1st constituency, Minister of the Interior
- Constituencies of the Corrèze, Atlaspol website
