= 2024 French legislative election in Corrèze =

Following the first round of the 2024 French legislative election on 30 June 2024, runoff elections in each constituency where no candidate received a vote share greater than 50 percent were scheduled for 7 July. Candidates permitted to stand in the runoff elections needed to either come in first or second place in the first round or achieve more than 12.5 percent of the votes of the entire electorate (as opposed to 12.5 percent of the vote share due to low turnout).

== Corrèze ==
=== 1st constituency ===
Candidate	Party or alliance		First round		Second round	
Candidate	Party or alliance		Votes	%	Votes	%
François Hollande	New Popular Front	Socialist Party	24,720	37.63	28,751	43.10
Maitey Pouget	National Rally		20,298	30.89	21,141	31.69
Francis Dubois	The Republicans		18,816	28.64	16,821	25.21
Marie-Thérèse Coinaud	Far-left	Lutte Ouvrière	1,303	1.98		
Gilles Oguinena	Reconquête		563	0.86		
Total			65,700	100.00	66,713	100.00
Valid votes			65,700	95.91	66,713	96.71
Invalid votes			1,242	1.81	951	1.38
Blank votes			1,563	2.28	1,317	1.91
Total votes			68,505	100.00	68,981	100.00
Registered voters/turnout			91,747	74.67	91,753	75.18

=== 2nd constituency ===
Candidate	Party or alliance		First round		Second round	
Candidate	Party or alliance		Votes	%	Votes	%
Valéry Elophe	National Rally		23,250	36.28	24,960	40.06
Frédérique Meunier	The Republicans		22,456	35.04	37,354	59.94
Amandine Dewaele	New Popular Front	The Ecologists	17,063	26.63		
Sylvie Sicard	Far-left	Lutte Ouvrière	1,309	2.04		
Total			64,078	100.00	62,314	100.00
Valid votes			64,078	95.97	62,314	93.34
Invalid votes			1,205	1.80	1,685	2.52
Blank votes			1,488	2.23	2,764	4.14
Total votes			66,771	100.00	66,763	100.00
Registered voters/turnout			93,265	71.59	93,279	71.57
