= Clément Chausson =

French politician

Mayor of Tulle
- In office 1947–1949

Personal details
- Born: 25 November 1887 Saint-Hilaire-Foissac, France
- Died: 12 January 1961 (aged 73) Saint-Bonnet-Avalouze, France
- Party: French Communist Party
- Occupation: Politician

Clément Chausson (25 November 1887 — 12 January 1961) was a French politician.

He was a member of the French Communist Party, and served as mayor of Tulle from 1947 to 1949. He was also a member of the French National Assembly. He was a member of the regional office in December 1938. He later became president of the wood merchants' union in the Corrèze.

== Biography ==
Clément Chausson was born in Saint-Hilaire-Foissac, France on 1887 and died in Saint-Bonnet-Avalouze, France on 1961 at the age of 73. He held this position until 1949 and retained his mandate as municipal councilor in the 1953 elections. He acquired near Tulle an agricultural property which he exploited with his family at the liberation. He spent the last years of his life taking care of his exploitation around Tulle.

== See also ==
- List of mayors of Tulle

Political offices
| Preceded by Jules Lafue | Mayors of Tulle; 1947-1949 | Succeeded by Jean Massoulier |
