= 2024 French legislative election in Aveyron =

Following the first round of the 2024 French legislative election on 30 June 2024, runoff elections in each constituency where no candidate received a vote share greater than 50 percent were scheduled for 7 July. Candidates permitted to stand in the runoff elections needed to either come in first or second place in the first round or achieve more than 12.5 percent of the votes of the entire electorate (as opposed to 12.5 percent of the vote share due to low turnout).

== Aveyron ==
=== 1st constituency ===
Candidate	Party or alliance		First round		Second round	
Candidate	Party or alliance		Votes	%	Votes	%
Stéphane Mazars	Ensemble	Renaissance	24,349	43.58	34,706	65.17
Jean-Philippe Chartier	National Rally		17,586	31.48	18,548	34.83
Léon Thebault	New Popular Front	The Ecologists	12,702	22.74		
Antoine Da Cruz	Miscellaneous right	Résistons !	811	1.45		
Arlette Saint-Avit	Far-left	Lutte Ouvrière	418	0.75		
Total			55,866	100.00	53,254	100.00
Valid votes			55,866	96.69	53,254	94.06
Invalid votes			605	1.05	966	1.71
Blank votes			1,307	2.26	2,397	4.23
Total votes			57,778	100.00	56,617	100.00
Registered voters/turnout			78,345	73.75	78,351	72.26

=== 2nd constituency ===
Candidate	Party or alliance		First round		Second round	
Candidate	Party or alliance		Votes	%	Votes	%
Marie-Christine Parolin	National Rally		15,922	33.11	19,159	44.31
Laurent Alexandre	New Popular Front	La France Insoumise	15,738	32.73	24,084	55.69
Samuel Deguara	Ensemble	Renaissance	14,690	30.55		
Jean-Philippe Armet	Sovereigntist right	Debout la France	1,141	2.37		
Lucile El Hedri	Far-left	Lutte Ouvrière	595	1.24		
Total			48,086	100.00	43,243	100.00
Valid votes			48,086	95.66	43,243	86.42
Invalid votes			781	1.55	2,200	4.40
Blank votes			1,399	2.78	4,593	9.18
Total votes			50,266	100.00	50,036	100.00
Registered voters/turnout			68,217	73.69	68,221	73.34

=== 3rd constituency ===
Candidate	Party or alliance		First round		Second round	
Candidate	Party or alliance		Votes	%	Votes	%
Pierre-Antoine Fevre	Union of the far right	The Republicans	18,044	35.46	19,561	39.71
Jean-François Rousset	Ensemble	Renaissance	16,514	32.45	29,696	60.29
Richard Bouigue	New Popular Front	Socialist Party	14,660	28.81		
Thierry Noël	Ecologists	Independent	1,066	2.09		
Bernard Combes	Far-left	Lutte Ouvrière	607	1.19		
Total			50,891	100.00	49,257	100.00
Valid votes			50,891	95.70	49,257	92.91
Invalid votes			799	1.50	1,185	2.24
Blank votes			1,486	2.79	2,573	4.85
Total votes			53,176	100.00	53,015	100.00
Registered voters/turnout			72,271	73.58	72,268	73.36
