= Raymond-Max Aubert =

French politician

Mayor of Tulle
- In office November 7, 1995 – March 19, 2001
- Preceded by: Jean Combasteil
- Succeeded by: François Hollande

Deputy of the National Assembly for Corrèze's 1st constituency
- In office March 28, 1993 – April 21, 1997
- Preceded by: François Hollande
- Succeeded by: François Hollande

Secretary of State for Rural Development
- In office May 18, 1995 – November 7, 1995

Personal details
- Born: 15 March 1947 (age 79) Innsbruck, Tyrol, Allied-occupied Austria
- Party: Rally for the Republic
- Education: Paris X-Nanterre University National School of Administration
- Profession: Inspector General of Equipment

Raymond-Max Aubert, (born March 15, 1947, in Innsbruck, Austria) is a high civil servant and French politician.

== Biography ==
=== Origins and training ===
Son of prefect Jacques Aubert and brother of historian Véronique Aubert, Raymond-Max Aubert is an alumnus of the École nationale d'administration (ENA, Voltaire class, 1980). He came out ranked 36th out of 42 (economic administration track).

=== Political career ===
In the 1988 French cantonal elections, he was elected General Councillor for Corrèze (canton de Tulle-Urbain-Nord) from October 3, 1988, to March 27, 1994. He was re-elected in the 1994 elections (mandate from March 27, 1994, to March 18, 2001). He was the leading candidate for the Right in the 1992 French regional elections in Limousin, an election won by the Socialist list led by Robert Savy. He was nevertheless elected regional councillor for Limousin from March 22, 1992, to March 15, 1998. In the 1993 French legislative elections, he was elected RPR deputy of the 1st constituency of Corrèze against François Hollande. Two years later, he became mayor of Tulle, succeeding the Communist Jean Combasteil. He lost both mandates in 1997 (deputy) and 2001 (mayor), both won by François Hollande.

From their shared past at the ENA, and these multiple political confrontations, a certain rivalry at local level can be associated with these two men.

He was also secretary of State in charge of Rural Development for the Minister of Regional Planning Bernard Pons, in the Alain Juppé Government I.

=== Administrative career ===
Inspector General of Equipment, he was delegate for regional planning and action (DATAR) from 1995 to 1997.

In 2003, he was elected chairman of the Board of Directors of the Agence nationale pour le chèque-vacances (ANCV); then, in 2009, chairman of the Board of Directors of the Centre national pour le développement du sport (CNDS).

He was also Deputy Vice-chairman of the Board of Directors of the Veolia Environnement Foundation.

== Decorations ==
- Officer of the Legion of Honor.

== Legal problems ==
On February 16, 2007, against the advice of the public prosecutor's office, the Paris Court of Appeal validated the indictments for “misappropriation of public funds” brought against the successive cabinet directors of the former Mayor of Paris between 1983 and 1995, Robert Pandraud, Daniel Naftalski and Michel Roussin. In all, some twenty people were prosecuted in this case, including the former secretary of State Raymond-Max Aubert.

He was subsequently dismissed from the case, as he was not one of the ten final defendants in the trial.
