= Sophie Dessus =

French politician

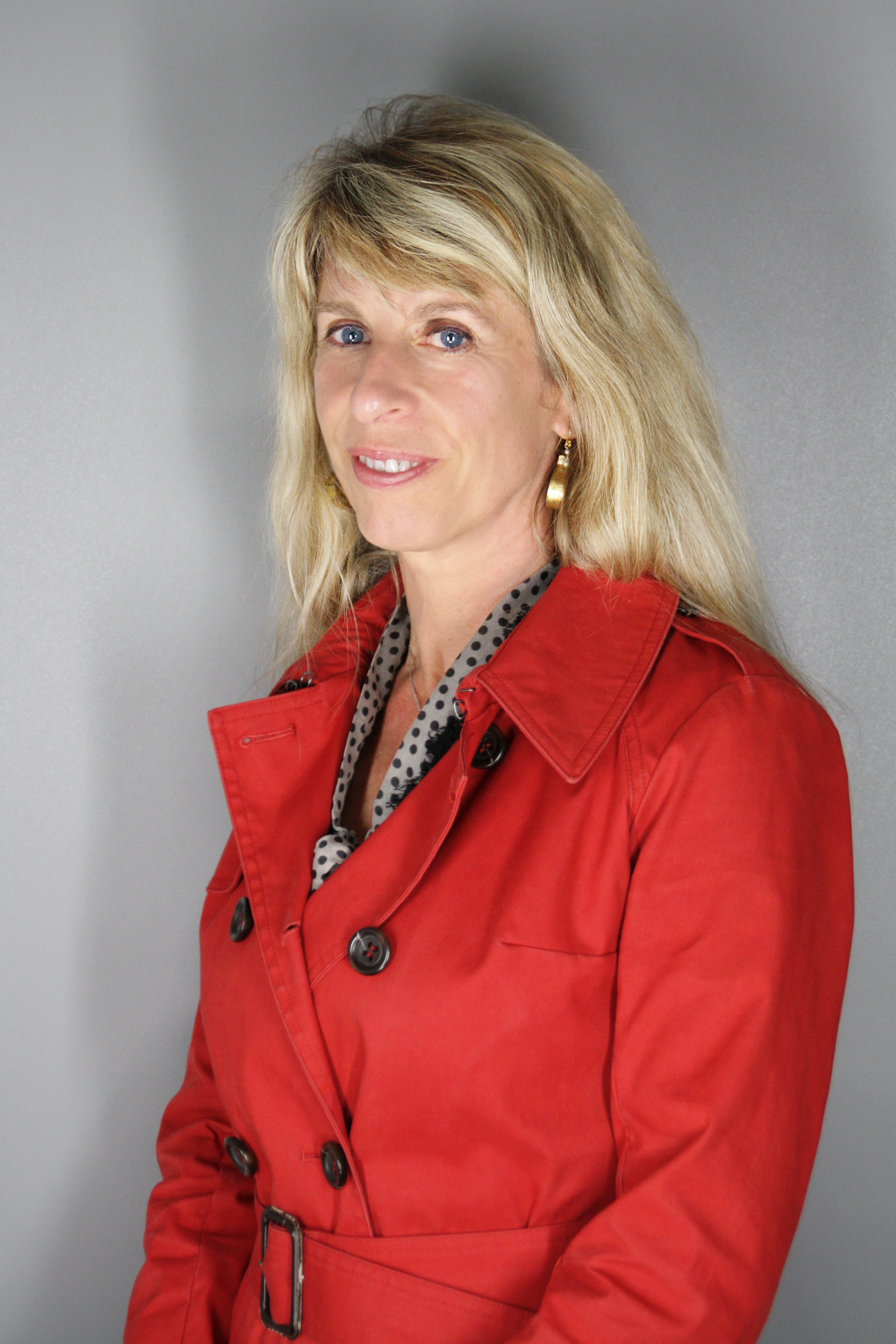
- Sophie Dessus in 2012

Member of the National Assembly for Corrèze's 1st constituency
- In office 20 June 2012 – 3 March 2016
- Preceded by: François Hollande
- Succeeded by: Alain Ballay

Mayor of Uzerche
- In office 18 March 2001 – 3 March 2016
- Preceded by: Valentin Larivière
- Succeeded by: Jean-Paul Grador

Personal details
- Born: 24 September 1955 Suresnes, France
- Died: 3 March 2016 (aged 60) Limoges, France
- Party: Socialist Party
- Education: University of Limoges

Sophie Dessus (24 September 1955 – 3 March 2016) was a Socialist politician from Corrèze, France, representing Corrèze's First Constituency in the National Assembly, the first woman to represent Corrèze in the National Assembly.

== Biography ==
Originally from Limousin, Sophie Dessus, née Dauriac, is the granddaughter of lawyer and academician Henri Mazeaud, to whom she is close, and the granddaughter of Simone de Beauvoir first cousin.

She grew up in Paris until her mother died when she was 15. She studied history and art history in Limoges.

On August 1, 1975, she married the son of a pharmacist, with whom she settled as a farmer in Corrèze. She has four children born between 1976 and 1987.

In 2012, she married Dominique Ceaux, the director general of services for the Corrèze departmental council, in her second marriage.
