= Jacques de Chammard =

French politician (1888–1983)

Mayors of Tulle
- In office 1925–1943
- Preceded by: François Malimont
- Succeeded by: Gabriel Bouty

Personal details
- Born: 1 January 1888 Tulle, France
- Died: 25 December 1983 (aged 95) Tulle, France
- Party: Radical-Socialist and Radical Republican Party (1924-1936); Democratic gauche (1938-940)
- Occupation: Politician

Jacques de Chammard (1 January 1888—25 December 1983) was a French politician.

He was a member of the Radical-Socialist and Radical Republican Party, and served as mayors of Tulle from 1925 to 1943. He was also re-elected to the mayors of Tulle. He later joined the party in Democratic gauche from 1938 to 1940. He was vice-president of the chamber of deputies from 1934 to 1936, and general councilor of the department from 1935.

== Biography ==
Jacques was born in Tulle, France on 1888 and died in Tulle, France on 1983 at the age of 95. Jacques de Chammard studies law qualified as brilliant and joins the prefectural administration as sub-prefect. He was also becomes mayor of his hometown.

Political offices
Preceded by François Malimont	Mayors of Tulle; 1925-1943	Succeeded by Gabriel Bouty
