= René Teulade =

French politician

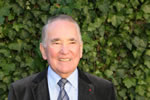
- René Teulade

Senator from Corrèze
- In office 1 October 2008 – 13 February 2014 Serving with Bernadette Bourzai
- Preceded by: Georges Mouly; Bernard Murat

Minister of Social Affairs
- In office 2 April 1992 – 29 March 1993
- Preceded by: Jean-Louis Bianco
- Succeeded by: Simone Veil

Personal details
- Born: 17 June 1931; Monceaux-sur-Dordogne, France
- Died: 13 February 2014 (aged 82); Paris, France
- Political party: Socialist Party
- Occupation: Retired civil servant

René Teulade (17 June 1931 – 13 February 2014) was a member of the Senate of France, representing the Corrèze department. He was a member of the Socialist Party.

He died of a stroke in 2014.
