= Thank You for This Moment =

2014 book by Valérie Trierweiler

Merci pour ce moment
- First edition
- Authors: Valérie Trierweiler
- Language: French
- Genre: Political memoir
- Publisher: Les Arènes
- Publication date: 4 September 2014
- Publication place: France
- Pages: 320

Merci pour ce moment (English:Thank you for this moment) is a 2014 best-selling political memoir authored by Valérie Trierweiler, a French journalist and the former partner of French President François Hollande.

== Summary ==
In this political memoir, French journalist Valérie Trierweiler recounts the eighteen months she spent as the romantic partner of French President François Hollande in 2013–2014. The book mixes the political and the personal.

Trierweiler writes that President Hollande "does not like the poor" and calls them "toothless." She also writes about finding out about his affair with French actress Julie Gayet from the press. She goes on to suggest he kept her on "astronomical" amounts of tranquilizers in hospital shortly after they broke up to make sure she would not make a scene.

== Critical reception ==
In France, the book became a bestseller, selling 200,000 copies during the first week. However, many bookshops refused to sell it, arguing they did not want to be an "outlet for Ms Trierweiler's dirty laundry."

In The Guardian, Kim Willsher criticised Trierweiler for publishing the book, asking, "Why would an intelligent, sophisticated woman, and a former political journalist to boot, write a book that causes random harm to so many, including the author, and does such a great disservice to women?"

The English version was translated by Clémence Sebag. It was scheduled to be released in the United States. The book has also been translated into Italian, Spanish, Albanian, Bulgarian, Chinese, Lithuanian, Portuguese, Polish, Romanian, Russian, Vietnamese and Persian.
