= Bernadette Bourzai =

French politician

Senator from Corrèze
- Incumbent
- Assumed office 1 October 2008 Serving with René Teulade
- Preceded by: Georges Mouly; Bernard Murat

Personal details
- Born: 28 May 1945 (age 80) Lapleau, Corrèze
- Party: Socialist
- Occupation: Retired teacher

Bernadette Bourzai (born 28 May 1945 in Lapleau) is a French politician and Member of the Senate of France representing the Department of Corrèze.

During her political career, she has held many local offices, including Égletons municipal council, Corrèze General Council, Limoges Regional Council, and Mayor of Égletons.

She was elected to the European Parliament on 18 June 2004, from the third position on the Socialist party list representing Loire, Massif Central, and sat on the European Parliament's Committee on Regional Development.

In addition, she was vice-chair of the delegation to the EU–Kazakhstan, EU–Kyrgyzstan and EU–Uzbekistan Parliamentary Cooperation Committees, and for relations with Tajikistan, Turkmenistan and Mongolia, a substitute for the Committee on Agriculture and Rural Development, and a substitute for the delegation to the EU–Turkey Joint Parliamentary Committee.

On 21 September 2008, she was elected to the Senate, representing the Department of Corrèze, and resigned her position in the European Parliament, replaced by Jean-Paul Denanot. In the Senate, she is Secretary of the Commission on European Affairs, and a member of the Commission on Cultural Affairs.

== Career ==
- Degree in history and geography, University of Clermont-Ferrand (1971)
- master's degree in geography, University of Clermont-Ferrand (1972)
- highest postgraduate teaching qualification in geography (1973)
- Teacher (with the highest postgraduate teaching qualification) (1973–1998)
- Member of the Socialist Party national council (1989–2004)
- Member of Égletons Municipal Council (1983–2001)
- Mayor of Égletons (2001–2004)
- Member of the Corrèze Departmental Council (since 1994)
- Member of the Limousin Regional Council (1986–2001)
- Vice-chairwoman of the Limousin Regional Council (1992–2001)
- Knight of the National Order of Merit
- Member of the European Parliament (2004–2008)
- Member of the Senate of France (2008- )
