= Valérie Trierweiler =

French journalist and author (born 1965)

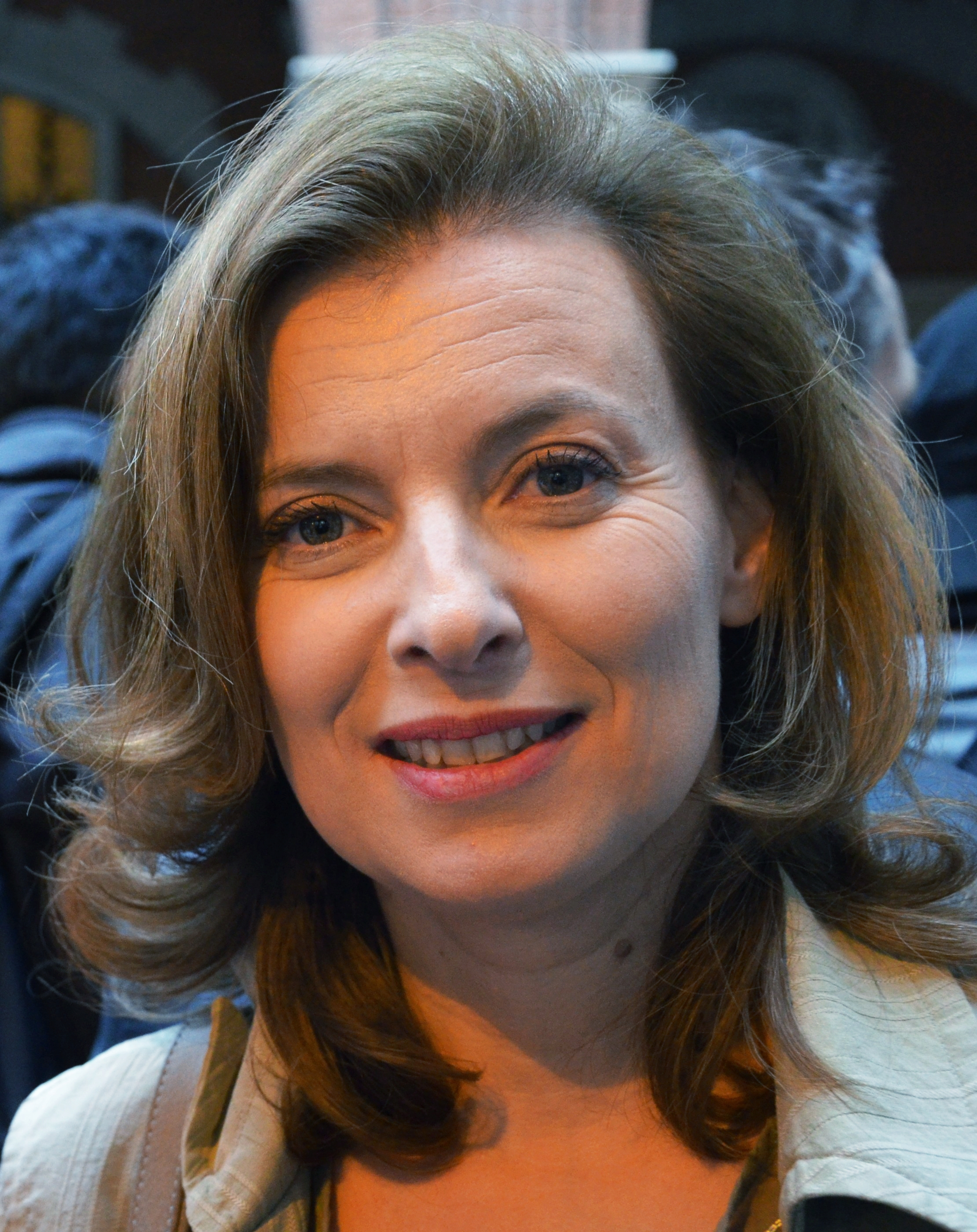
- Trierweiler in 2012

Partner of the President of France
- In role 15 May 2012 – 25 January 2014
- President: François Hollande
- Preceded by: Carla Bruni-Sarkozy
- Succeeded by: Brigitte Macron (2017)

Personal details
- Born: Valérie Massonneau; 16 February 1965 (age 61) Angers, France
- Spouses: Franck Thurieau (m. 1989; div. 1992); Denis Trierweiler (m. 1995; div. 2010)
- Domestic partner(s): François Hollande (2007–2014)
- Children: 3
- Education: Paris 1 Panthéon-Sorbonne University (DESS)
- Occupation: Journalist, talk show host

Valérie Trierweiler (French pronunciation: [valeʁi tʁiɛʁvɛlɛːʁ]; née Massonneau; born 16 February 1965) is a French journalist and author. She has hosted political talk shows and has contributed to Paris Match. She is best known for having been the partner of the president of France, François Hollande, until January 2014.

== Early life ==
Valérie Massonneau was born in Angers, the fifth child of six. Her father, Jean-Noël Massonneau, had lost a leg on a landmine during the Second World War, when he was 13, and died at the age of 53, when his daughter was 21. Her mother worked at the front desk of the Angers ice rink following the death of her father.

Massonneau studied history and political science and obtained a Diplôme d'études supérieures spécialisées in political science from the University of Paris 1 Pantheon-Sorbonne.

== Career ==
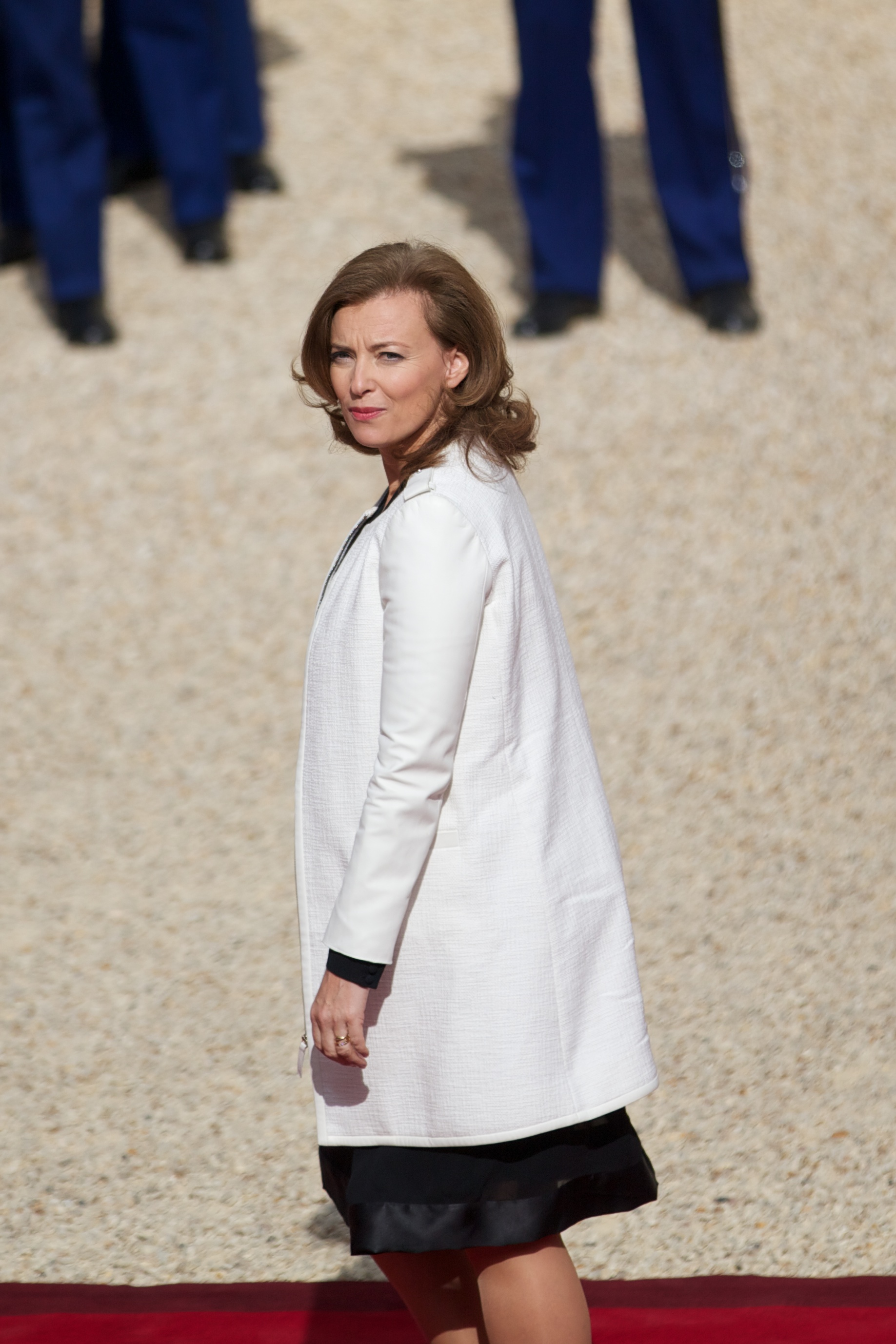
Valérie Trierweiler in 2012

In 2005, Trierweiler began to host political talk shows, especially interviews, on the Direct 8 television channel. She fronted the weekly political talk show Le Grand 8 until 2007 and with Mikaël Guedj has co-hosted the weekly show Politiquement parlant ("politically speaking") since September of that year.

In 2012, Trierweiler announced that she would keep her contract as a journalist with the Paris Match magazine during the presidency of her boyfriend, Francois Hollande.

On 12 June 2012, Trierweiler caused widespread controversy by tweeting in support of Olivier Falorni, who was standing for election as a dissident socialist candidate at La Rochelle, against Ségolène Royal, Hollande's former partner. Hollande had already made public his own support for Royal's campaign.

In 2017, Trierweiler published her first novel, Le secret d'Adèle. The book is about the life of Adele Bloch-Bauer, best known for Gustav Klimt's Portrait of Adele Bloch-Bauer I.

== Personal life ==
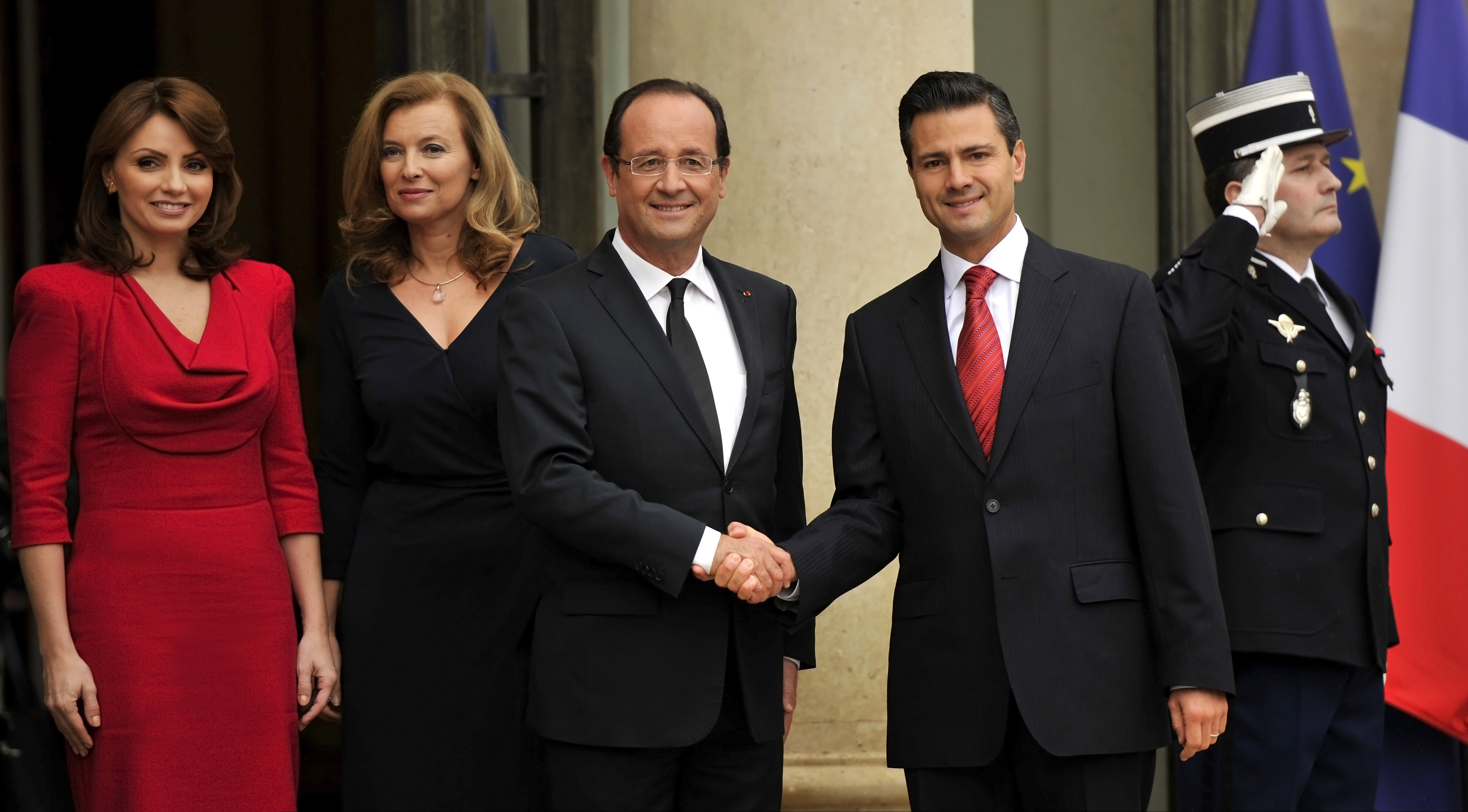
Peña Nieto, Hollande and partners in Paris, in 2012.

Trierweiler's first marriage, to childhood friend Franck Thurieau, ended in divorce with no children. Her second marriage was to Denis Trierweiler, a sub-editor at Paris Match magazine, and a writer and academic. This marriage produced three children, and divorce proceedings took three years (2007–2010).

Trierweiler met François Hollande during the parliamentary elections of 1988 while he was living with Ségolène Royal. They began their relationship in 2007, while she was still married, and made it public in October 2010 after her divorce was publicized.

In January 2014, a story in the celebrity magazine Closer featured seven pages of alleged revelations and photos about an affair between Hollande and the French actress Julie Gayet. Trierweiler was subsequently admitted to hospital on 10 January "for rest and some tests". On 17 January, Hollande made his first private visit to see her in hospital. On 25 January, it was announced her relationship with Hollande had ended.

In September 2014, a book written by Trierweiler, Merci pour ce moment (Thank You for This Moment), was published. It details her relationship with Hollande and their breakup.

== Honours ==
- Japan: Grand Cordon (Paulownia) of the Order of the Paulownia Flowers (31 May 2013)

== Bibliography ==
- Merci pour ce moment (Paris: Les Arènes, 2014).
- Le secret d'Adèle. Paris: Les Arènes. 2017. ISBN 9782352046158. OCLC 987907877.

Unofficial roles
Preceded by Carla Bruni-Sarkozy as Spouse of the President	Partner of the President of France; 2012–2014	Vacant Title next held by Brigitte Macron as Spouse of the President
