= Jean-Pierre Bechter =

French politician

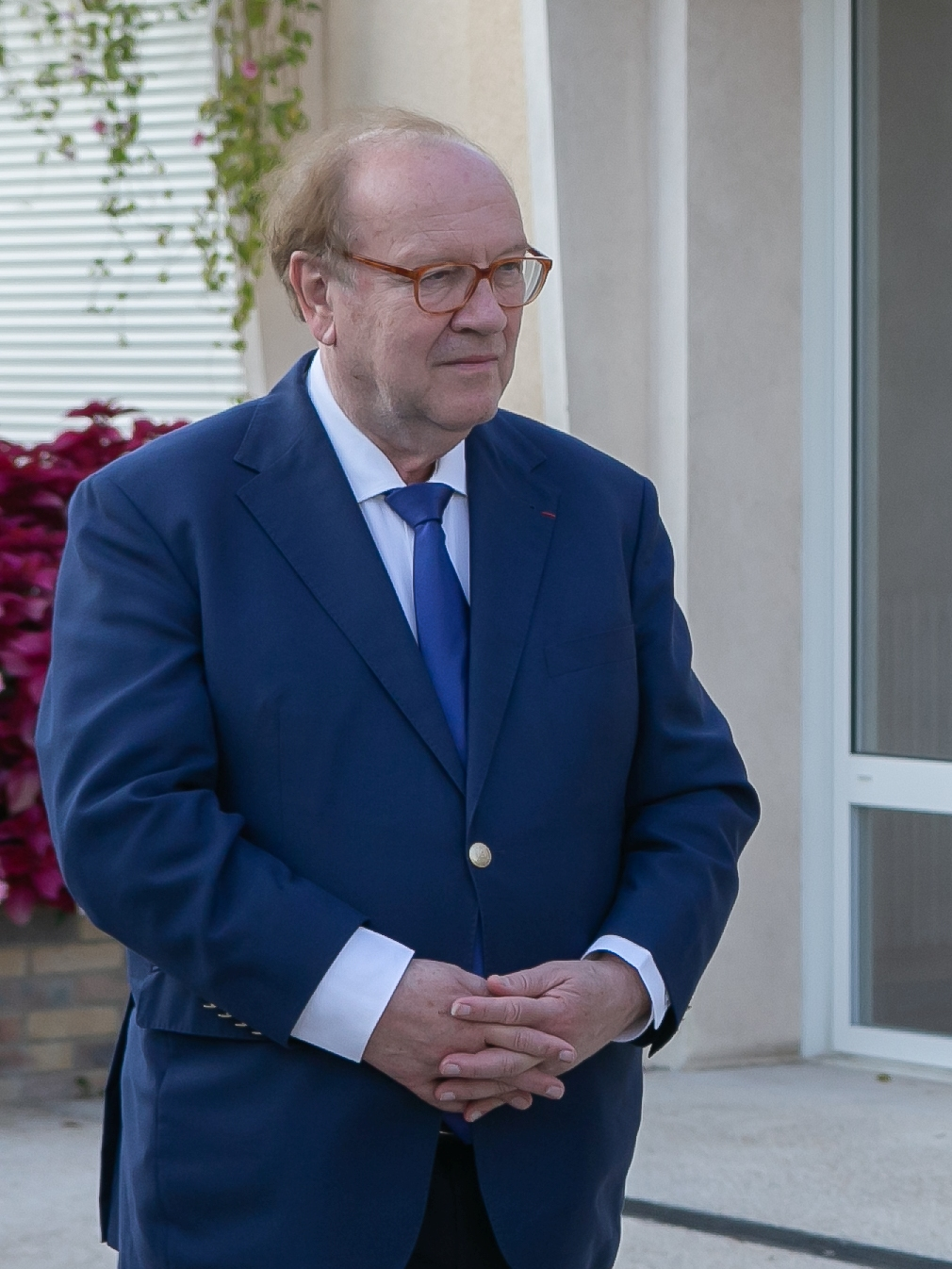
- Jean-Pierre Bechter in 2018

Member of the Departmental council of Essonne
- Incumbent
- Assumed office 9 July 2018
- Preceded by: Serge Dassault

Mayor of Corbeil-Essonnes
- In office 11 October 2009 – 7 October 2010
- Preceded by: Serge Dassault
- In office 19 December 2010 – 4 July 2020
- Succeeded by: Bruno Piriou

Personal details
- Born: 10 November 1944 (age 81) Ussel, France
- Party: The Republicans
- Education: Sciences Po Aix

Jean-Pierre Bechter (French pronunciation: [ʒɑ̃ pjɛʁ bɛʃtɛʁ]; born 10 November 1944) is a French politician and sub-prefect.

He is a member of the Union for a Popular Movement, and served as mayor of Corbeil-Essonnes in 2010 and 2014. He is a departmental councilor of Essonne since 2018. He was a deputy of French from 22 April 1986 to 14 May 1988. He was re-elected to the Paris council.

== Biography ==
Jean-Pierre Bechter was born in Ussel, Corrèze, France in 1944. He leads in the 2014 municipal election in Corbeil-Essonnes wins in the second round with 56.52% of the vote. Serge Dassault, who is his substitute, replaced him on the departmental council on 28 September. Beaten in 1981 by the communist mayor of Tulle, Jean Combasteil, he returned to the National Assembly on 2 April 1986, replacing Jacques Chirac, appointed prime minister.

Political offices
Preceded by Serge Dassault	Mayor of Corbeil-Essonnes; 5 April 2014 - 4 July 2020	Succeeded by Bruno Piriou
