= Bernard Combes =

French politician

Mayor of Tulle
- Incumbent
- Assumed office 17 March 2008
- Preceded by: François Hollande

Personal details
- Born: Bernard Combes; 13 February 1960 (age 66) Tübingen, West Germany
- Party: Socialist Party

Bernard Combes (born 13 March 1960) is a French politician. He is mayor of Tulle and general councillor of Roche-Canillac Canton. In the 2017 French legislative election, he was the socialist candidate for Corrèze's 1st constituency, losing to En Marche's Christophe Jerretie in the second round.
