= List of mayors of Tulle =

The office of the Mayor of Tulle is a directly elected position. Since 1947 there have been eight mayors; the term of office is for a period of six years. Since 2008, the mayor is Bernard Combes (PS).

== List of mayors ==
Period	Name	Party	Other position held
1795–1808	François Duval
1808–1811	Pierre Ludière
1812–1815	Antoine Melon
1815–1816	Jean Pierre Lacombe
1816–1825	Guy Joseph Rémi de Saint-Priest de Saint-Mur
1825–1830	Antoine de Valon
1830–1837	Lacoste-Dumont
1837–1846	Martial Soleilhet
1846–1848	François Favars
1848–1849	M.Sage
1849–1851	Louis Joseph Hugo
1851–1857	François Favars
1857–1863	Henri Brugère
1863–1871	Guy Joseph Rémi Lafond de Saint-Mur
1871–1871	Louis Joseph Parrical de Chammard
1871–1872	M.Floucaud-Pénardille
1872–1873	Dominique Boudrie
1873–1874	Jean Emile Téreygeol
1874–1875	M.Paris
1876–1878	Conchard de Vermeil
1878–1883	Edouard Charain
1883–1884	Léon Borie
1884–1887	Ernest Brugère
1887–1891	Jules Vergne
1891–1892	Joseph Saugon
1892–1912	Jean-Baptiste Tavé
1912–1919	Alfred Parrical de Chammard
1919–1922	Gustave Maschat
1922–1925	François Malimont
1925–1943	Jacques de Chammard
1943–1944	Gabriel Bouty
1944–1947	Jules Lafue
1947–1949	Clément Chausson	Communist
1949–1959	Jean Massoulier
1959–1971	Jean Montalat	SFIO, Socialist
1971–1977	Georges Mouly	Rally for the Republic
1977–1995	Jean Combasteil	Communist
1995–2001	Raymond-Max Aubert	Rally for the Republic
2001–2008	François Hollande	Socialist	Socialist nominee for 2012 presidential election, President of France, 2012–2017
Since 2008	Bernard Combes	Socialist
