= Jean-Paul Denanot =

French politician (born 1944)

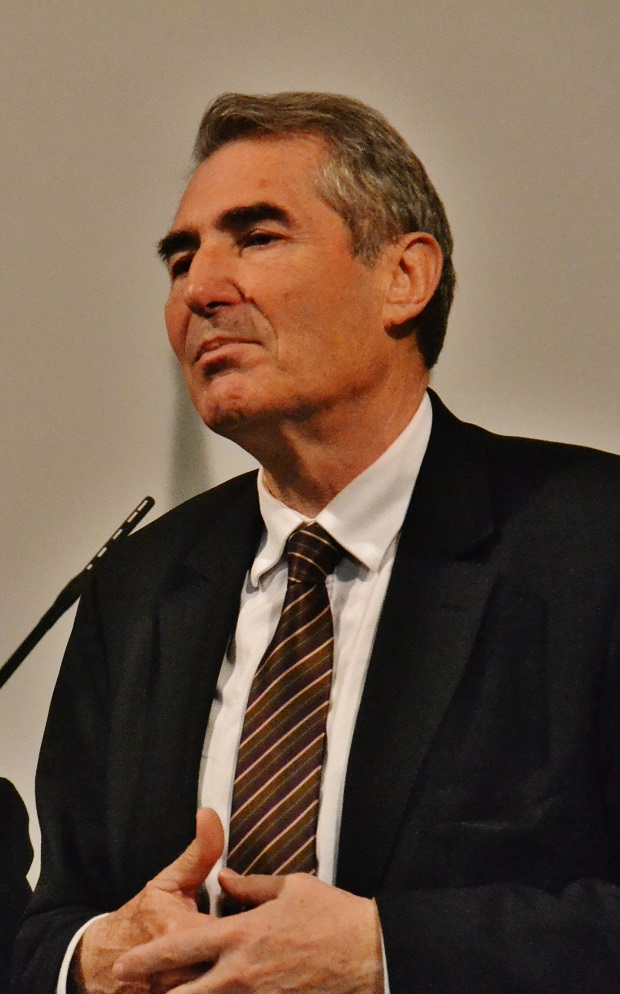
- Jean-Paul Denanot, in 2013

President of the Regional Council of Limousin
- In office 28 March 2004 – 30 September 2014
- Preceded by: Robert Savy
- Succeeded by: Gérard Vandenbroucke
- Constituency: Limousin

Member of the European Parliament
- In office 6 October 2008 – 13 July 2009
- Preceded by: Bernadette Bourzai
- Constituency: Loire, Massif Central
- In office 1 July 2014 – 10 June 2018
- Succeeded by: Karine Gloanec Maurin
- Constituency: Loire, Massif Central

Personal details
- Born: 24 April 1944 (age 82)
- Party: Socialist

Jean-Paul Denanot (French: [ʒɑ̃pɔl dənano]; born 24 April 1944) is a French politician, a member of the Socialist Party.

Between 1992 and 2004, he was Mayor of the town of Feytiat, in Haute-Vienne, a post which he gave up in order to become President of the Regional Council of Limousin.

He had run for the European Parliament in the 2004 elections in the Constituency of Loire, Massif Central, but was ranked one place too low on the Socialist list to be elected. In September 2008, Bernadette Bourzai resigned from the Parliament, due to her election to the French Senate, and Denanot took her place. Doing so, he became the first President of a French regional council to also be an MEP, although at the same time he resigned his positions as assistant to the Mayor of Feytiat, and Vice President of the Agglomeration community of Limoges-Metropole.
