= Jean Montalat =

French politician (1912–1971)

Jean Montalat (12 July 1912, Tulle - 22 September 1971) was a French politician. During the Second World War, he was drafted into and subsequently joined the Alliance network of the French Resistance, escaping to Algeria in 1943 to join the Free French forces. He represented the French Section of the Workers' International (SFIO) in the National Assembly from 1951 to 1971 and was the mayor of Tulle from 1959 to 1971.

Political offices
Preceded by Jean Massoulier	Mayors of Tulle; 1959–1971	Succeeded by Georges Mouly
