= Francis Dubois =

French politician (born 1961)

Member of the National Assembly for Corrèze's 1st constituency
- In office 21 June 2022 – 9 June 2024
- Preceded by: Christophe Jerretie
- Succeeded by: François Hollande

Personal details
- Born: 28 November 1961 (age 64) Liginiac, Corrèze France
- Party: Republican (since 2022)
- Other political affiliations: Union of the Right and Centre (2022)

Francis Dubois (born 28 November 1961) is a French politician of the Republicans (LR) who served as a member of the National Assembly for Corrèze's 1st constituency from 2022 to 2024.

In the run-up to the Republicans’ 2022 convention, Dubois endorsed Éric Ciotti as the party's chairman.
