= Christophe Jerretie =

French politician

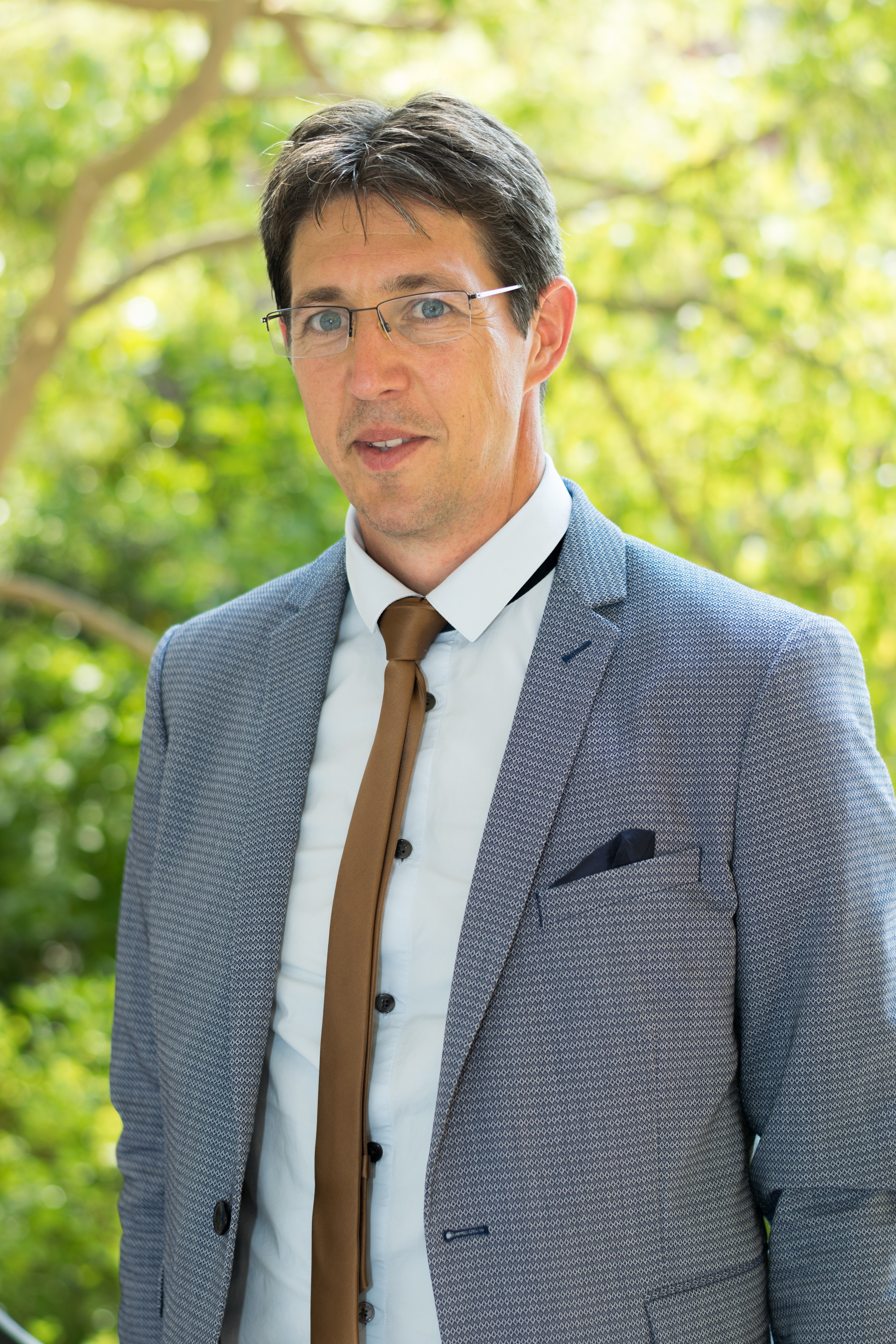

Member of the National Assembly for Corrèze's 1st constituency
- In office 21 June 2017 – 21 June 2022
- Preceded by: Alain Ballay
- Succeeded by: Francis Dubois

Personal details
- Born: 31 August 1979 (age 47) Tulle, France
- Party: LREM (since 2017-2020)
- Education: University of Limoges

Christophe Jerretie (born 31 August 1979) is a French politician of the La République En Marche! (LREM) who was a member of the French National Assembly from 2017–2022, representing the department of Corrèze. From 2017–2020 he was a member of La République En Marche! (LREM).

== Political career ==
Jerretie was mayor of Naves for three years before getting into parliament. In parliament, Jerretie served on the Finance Committee and the Committee on European Affairs. In addition to his committee assignments, he was a member of the French-Swedish Parliamentary Friendship Group.

In July 2019, Jerretie challenged incumbent chairman Gilles Le Gendre for the leadership of the LREM parliamentary group; Le Gendre was subsequently re-elected in the first round, with Jerretie coming in sixth out of seven candidates. In 2020, Jerretie left the LREM group and instead joined the MoDem group.

Jerretie lost his seat in the first round of the 2022 French legislative election.

== Political positions ==
In 2019, Jerretie was one of nine MPs from the LREM parliamentary group who voted against the party line and opposed the Comprehensive Economic and Trade Agreement (CETA) with Canada.

== See also ==
- 2017 French legislative election
