= Georges Mouly =

French politician (1931–2019)

Mayor of Saint-Priest-de-Gimel
- In office March 1989 – March 2001

Regional Councillor for Corrèze
- In office 1982–2008

Senator for Corrèze
- In office 28 September 1980 – 30 September 2008
- Preceded by: Jacques Coudert; Marcel Champeix
- Succeeded by: Bernadette Bourzai; René Teulade

Mayor of Tulle
- In office 21 March 1974 – 24 March 1977
- Preceded by: Jean Montalat
- Succeeded by: Jean Combasteil

Personal details
- Born: 21 February 1931
- Died: 7 December 2019 (aged 88) Tulle, France
- Party: Radical Party
- Occupation: Politician

Georges Mouly (21 February 1931 – 7 December 2019) was a French politician and professor and a member of the European Democratic and Social Rally group.

After serving as a professor, Mouly was elected as a Senator for Corrèze in 1980, 1989, and 1998. He did not stand for re-election in 2008, and retired from his political career.

Mouly was the author of several books, including Les années d'insouciance and Profession, débutant....
