= Saint-Hilaire-Foissac =

- Commune
- Coat of arms
- Location of Saint-Hilaire-Foissac
- Location within France Location within Nouvelle-Aquitaine
- Coordinates: 45°19′54″N 2°07′33″E
- Country: France
- Region: Nouvelle-Aquitaine
- Department: Corrèze
- Arrondissement: Ussel
- Canton: Égletons

Government
  - Mayor (2020–2026): Annette Bourrier
- Area^{1}: 36.92 km^{2} (14.25 sq mi)
- Elevation: 570 m (1,870 ft)
- Highest elevation: 673 m (2,208 ft)
- Lowest elevation: 359 m (1,178 ft)
- Population (2023): 196
  - Density: 5.31/km^{2} (13.7/sq mi)
- Time zone: UTC+01:00 (CET)
  - Summer (DST): UTC+02:00 (CEST)
- INSEE/Postal code: 19208 /19550
- ^{1} French Land Register data, which excludes lakes, ponds, glaciers > 1 km^{2} (0.386 sq mi or 247 acres) and river estuaries.

Saint-Hilaire-Foissac (French pronunciation: [sɛ̃.t‿ilɛʁ fwasak]; Occitan: Sent Alari Foissac) is a commune in the Corrèze department in central France.

== Geography ==
The Luzège forms the commune's northeastern boundary.

== Population ==
Historical population
Year	Pop.	±% p.a.
1968	311	—
1975	275	−1.74%
1982	224	−2.89%
1990	201	−1.35%
1999	232	+1.61%
2007	214	−1.00%
2012	210	−0.38%
2017	188	−2.19%
2023	196	+0.70%
Source: INSEE

== See also ==
- Communes of the Corrèze department
