= Jean Combasteil =

French politician

Mayor of Tulle
- In office 25 March 1977 – 25 June 1995
- Preceded by: Georges Mouly
- Succeeded by: Raymond-Max Aubert

Member of parliament for Corrèze
- In office 21 June 1981 – 1 April 1986
- Preceded by: Jean-Pierre Bechter
- Succeeded by: -

Personal details
- Born: 28 July 1936 (age 90) Rosiers-d'Égletons, France
- Party: French Communist Party
- Occupation: Politician; Information inspector

Jean Combasteil (born 28 July 1936) is a French politician and Information inspector.

He is a member of the French Communist Party and served as Mayor of Tulle from 25 March 1977 to 25 June 1995. He was a candidate for his own succession during the municipal elections of 1995 in Tulle. He was re-elected mayor of Tulle in 1983 during the municipal elections of 1989. He left his mandate in 2008.

== Biography ==
Jean Combasteil was born in Rosiers-d'Égletons, France in 1936. He was elected general councilor of Corrèze in the Canton of Tulle-Urbain-Sud 3 years later. He was beaten by the right-wing candidate Raymond-Max Aubert. He also served as secretary of state for rural development since May of the same year in the juppe government.

== See also ==
- List of mayors of Tulle

Political offices
Preceded by Georges Mouly	Mayor of Tulle; 25 March 1977 – 25 June 1995	Succeeded by Raymond-Max Aubert
Preceded by Jean-Pierre Bechter	Member of parliament for Corrèze; 21 June 1981 – 1 April 1986	Succeeded by -
