= François Hollande =

President of France from 2012 to 2017

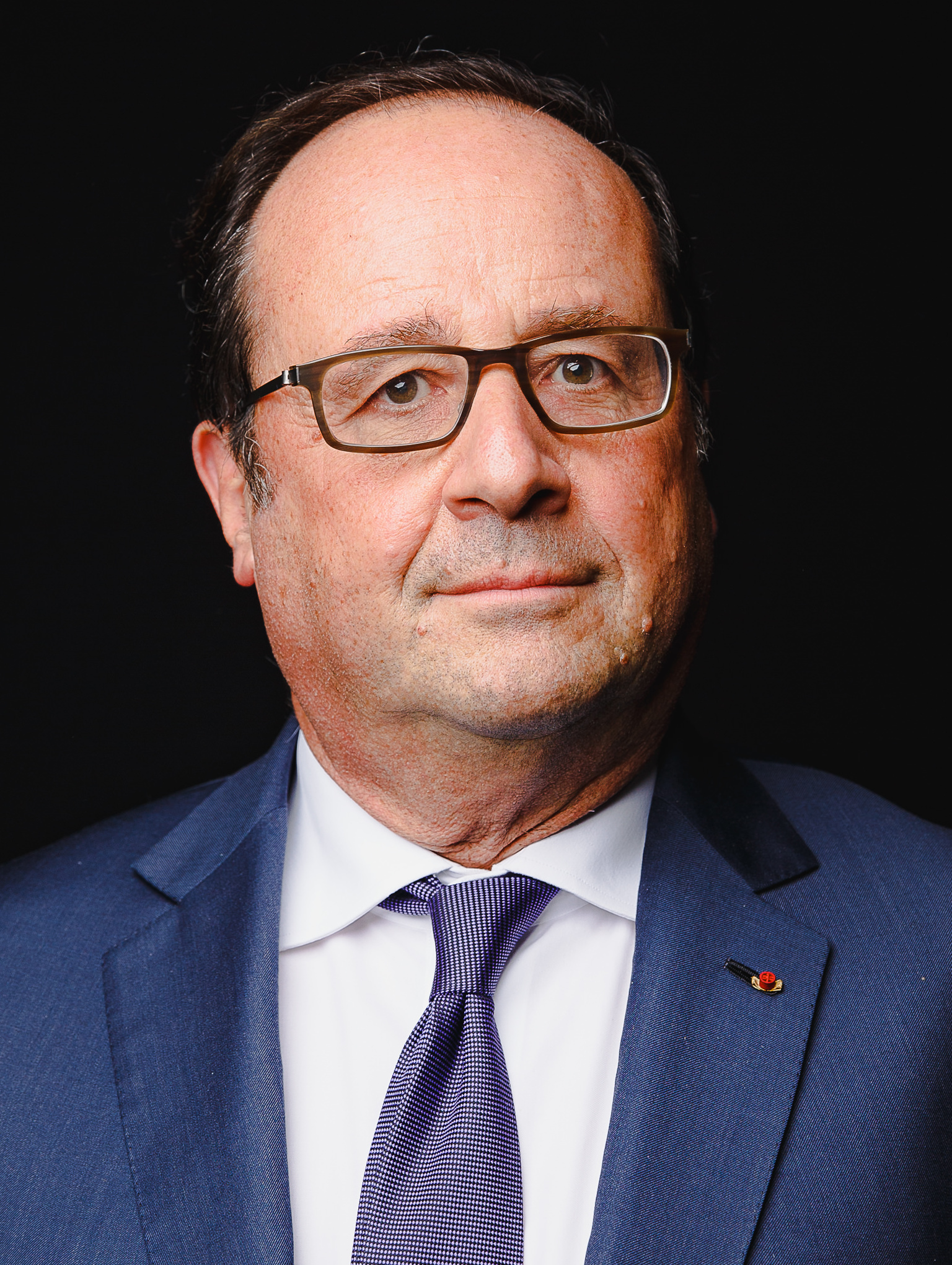
- Hollande in 2017

President of France
- In office 15 May 2012 – 14 May 2017
- Prime Minister: Jean-Marc Ayrault; Manuel Valls; Bernard Cazeneuve
- Preceded by: Nicolas Sarkozy
- Succeeded by: Emmanuel Macron

President of the General Council of Corrèze
- In office 20 March 2008 – 15 May 2012
- Preceded by: Jean-Pierre Dupont
- Succeeded by: Gérard Bonnet

First Secretary of the Socialist Party
- In office 27 November 1997 – 27 November 2008
- Preceded by: Lionel Jospin
- Succeeded by: Martine Aubry

Mayor of Tulle
- In office 17 March 2001 – 17 March 2008
- Preceded by: Raymond-Max Aubert
- Succeeded by: Bernard Combes

Member of the National Assembly for Corrèze's 1st constituency
- Incumbent
- Assumed office 8 July 2024
- Preceded by: Francis Dubois
- In office 12 June 1997 – 14 May 2012
- Preceded by: Lucien Renaudie
- Succeeded by: Sophie Dessus
- In office 23 June 1988 – 1 April 1993
- Preceded by: Constituency re-established
- Succeeded by: Raymond-Max Aubert

Member of the European Parliament
- In office 20 July 1999 – 17 December 1999
- Constituency: France

Personal details
- Born: François Gérard Georges Nicolas Hollande; 12 August 1954 (age 72) Rouen, France
- Party: Socialist Party
- Spouse: Julie Gayet (m. 2022)
- Domestic partners: Ségolène Royal (1978–2007); Valérie Trierweiler (2007–2014)
- Children: 4
- Education: Panthéon-Assas University; HEC Paris; Sciences Po Paris; École nationale d'administration

Military service
- Branch/service: French Army
- François Hollande's voice Hollande's reaction on dealing with the chemical attack in Damascus; Recorded 3 September 2013

François Gérard Georges Nicolas Hollande (French: [fʁɑ̃swa ʒeʁaʁ ʒɔʁʒ(ə) nikɔla ɔlɑ̃d]; born 12 August 1954) is a French politician who served as President of France from 2012 to 2017. Before his presidency, he was First Secretary of the Socialist Party (PS) from 1997 to 2008, Mayor of Tulle from 2001 to 2008, as well as President of the General Council of Corrèze from 2008 to 2012. He has also held the 1st constituency of Corrèze seat in the National Assembly three times, first from 1988 to 1993, then from 1997 to 2012, and from 2024 onwards.

Born in Rouen and raised in the Parisian suburb of Neuilly-sur-Seine, Hollande began his political career as a special advisor to newly-elected President François Mitterrand before serving as a staffer for Max Gallo, the government's spokesman. He became a member of the National Assembly in 1988 and was elected First Secretary of the PS in 1997. Following the 2004 regional elections won by the PS, Hollande was cited as a potential presidential candidate, but he resigned as First Secretary and was immediately elected to replace Jean-Pierre Dupont as President of the General Council of Corrèze in 2008. In 2011, Hollande announced that he would be a candidate in the primary election to select the PS presidential nominee; he won the nomination against Martine Aubry before he was elected to the presidency (becoming also, ex officio, Co-Prince of Andorra) on 6 May 2012 in the second round with 51.6% of the vote, defeating incumbent Nicolas Sarkozy.

During his tenure, Hollande legalised same-sex marriage by passing Bill no. 344, reformed labour laws and credit training programmes, signed a law restricting the cumul des mandats, and withdrew French forces in Afghanistan, in addition to concluding an EU directive on the protection of animals in laboratory research through a Franco-German contract. Hollande led the country through the January and November 2015 Paris attacks, as well as the 2016 Nice attack. He was a leading proponent of EU mandatory migrant quotas and NATO's 2011 military intervention in Libya. He also sent troops to Mali and the Central African Republic with the approval of the UN Security Council in order to stabilise those countries, two operations however largely seen as failures. He drew controversy among his left-wing electoral base for supporting the Saudi Arabian-led intervention in Yemen.

Under Hollande's presidency, Paris hosted the 2015 United Nations Climate Change Conference, and his efforts to bring the 2024 Summer Olympics to the city were successful. However, with domestic troubles – in particular due to Islamic terrorism – over the course of his tenure, and unemployment rising to 10%, he faced spikes and downturns in approval rates, ultimately making him the most unpopular head of state under the Fifth Republic. On 1 December 2016, he announced he would not seek reelection in the 2017 presidential election, for which polls suggested his defeat in the first round.

== Early life and education ==
Hollande was born on 12 August 1954 in Rouen. His mother, Nicole Frédérique Marguerite Tribert (1927–2009), was a social worker, and his father, Georges Gustave Hollande (1922–2020), was an ear, nose, and throat doctor, who "ran for local election on a far right ticket in 1959". The name "Hollande" meant "one originally from Holland" – it is mostly found in Hollande's ancestral land, Hauts-de-France, and it is speculated to be Dutch in origin. The earliest known member of the Hollande family lived c. 1569 near Plouvain, working as a miller.

When Hollande was thirteen, the family moved to Neuilly-sur-Seine, a highly exclusive suburb of Paris. He attended Saint-Jean-Baptiste-de-la-Salle boarding school, a private Catholic school in Rouen, the Lycée Pasteur, in Neuilly-sur-Seine, receiving his baccalaureate in 1972 then graduated with a bachelor's degree in Law from Panthéon-Assas University. Hollande studied at HEC Paris, graduated in 1975, and then attended the Institut d'études politiques de Paris and the École nationale d'administration (ENA). He completed his military service in the French Army in 1977. He graduated from the ENA in 1980, and chose to enter the prestigious Cour des comptes.

Hollande lived in the United States in the summer of 1974 while he was a university student. Immediately after graduation, he was employed as a councillor in the Court of Audit.

== Early political career ==
Five years after volunteering as a student to work for François Mitterrand's ultimately unsuccessful campaign in the 1974 presidential election, Hollande joined the Socialist Party. He was quickly spotted by Jacques Attali, a senior adviser to Mitterrand, who arranged for Hollande to run in legislative election of 1981 in Corrèze against future President Jacques Chirac, who was then the leader of the Rally for the Republic, a Neo-Gaullist party. Hollande lost to Chirac in the first round.

He went on to become a special advisor to newly elected President Mitterrand, before serving as a staffer for Max Gallo, the government's spokesman. After becoming a municipal councillor for Ussel in 1983, he contested Corrèze for a second time in 1988, this time being elected to the National Assembly. Hollande lost his bid for re-election to the Assembly in the so-called "blue wave" of the 1993 election, described as such due to the number of seats gained by the Right at the expense of the Socialist Party.

=== First Secretary of the Socialist Party (1997–2008) ===
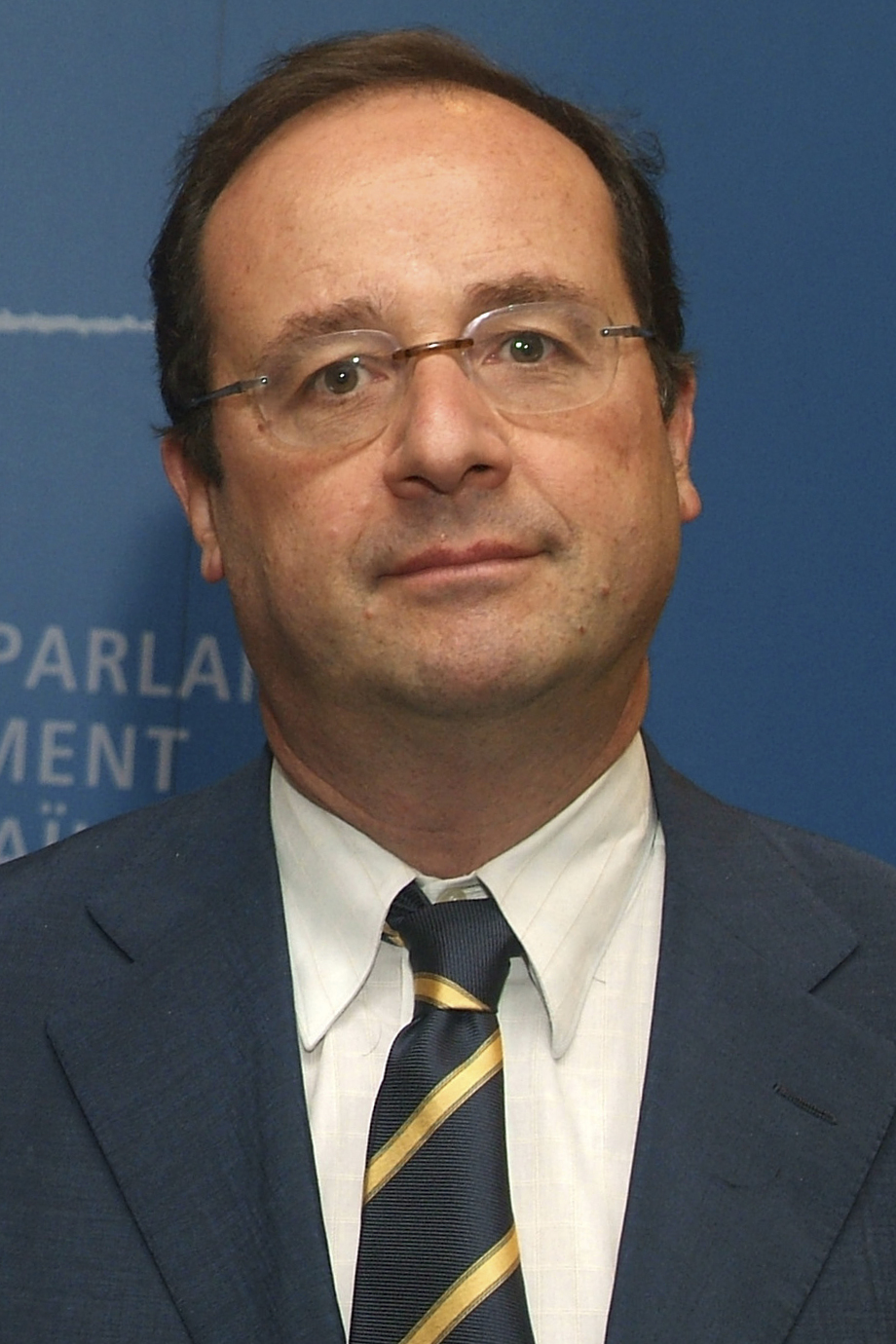
Hollande in 2005

As the end of Mitterrand's term in office approached, the Socialist Party was torn by a struggle of internal factions, each seeking to influence the direction of the party. Hollande pleaded for reconciliation and for the party to unite behind Jacques Delors, the President of the European Commission, but Delors renounced his ambitions to run for the French presidency in 1995. Former party leader Lionel Jospin resumed his position, and selected Hollande to become the official party spokesman. Hollande went on to contest Corrèze once again in 1997, successfully returning to the National Assembly.

That same year, Jospin became the Prime Minister of France, and Hollande won the election for his successor as First Secretary of the party, a position he would hold for eleven years. Because of the very strong position of the Socialist Party within the French government during this period, Hollande's position led some to refer to him the "Vice Prime Minister". Hollande would go on to be elected mayor of Tulle in 2001, an office he would hold for the next seven years.

The immediate resignation of Jospin from politics following his shock defeat by far-right candidate Jean-Marie Le Pen in the first round of the 2002 presidential election forced Hollande to become the public face of the party for the 2002 legislative election. Although he managed to limit defeats and was re-elected in his own constituency, the Socialists lost nationally. In order to prepare for the 2003 party congress in Dijon, he obtained the support of many notable personalities of the party and was re-elected first secretary against opposition from left-wing factions.

After the triumph of the Left in the 2004 regional elections, Hollande was cited as a potential presidential candidate, but the Socialists were divided on the European Constitution, and Hollande's support for the ill-fated "Yes" position in the French referendum on the European constitution caused friction within the party. Although Hollande was re-elected as first secretary at the Le Mans Congress in 2005, his authority over the party began to decline. Eventually his domestic partner, Ségolène Royal, was chosen to represent the party in the 2007 presidential election, where she would lose to Nicolas Sarkozy.

Hollande was widely blamed for the poor performances of the Socialist Party in the 2007 elections, and he announced that he would not seek another term as First Secretary. Hollande publicly declared his support for Bertrand Delanoë, the mayor of Paris, but it was Martine Aubry who would go on to win the race to succeed him in 2008. Hollande was next elected to replace Jean-Pierre Dupont as the president of the General Council of Corrèze in April 2008, and won re-election in 2011.

=== 2012 presidential campaign ===
Hollande announced in early 2011 that he would be a candidate in the upcoming primary election to select the Socialist and Radical Left Party presidential nominee. The primary marked the first time that both parties had held an open primary to select a joint nominee at the same time. He initially trailed the front-runner, former finance minister and International Monetary Fund managing director Dominique Strauss-Kahn. Following Strauss-Kahn's arrest on suspicion of sexual assault in New York City in May 2011, Hollande began to lead the opinion polls, and his position as front-runner was established just as Strauss-Kahn declared that he would no longer seek the nomination. After a series of televised debates with other candidates throughout September, Hollande topped the ballot in the first round held on 9 October with 39% of the vote. He did not, however, gain the 50% required to avoid a run-off election, and was obliged to enter a second ballot against Martine Aubry, who had come in second with 30% of the vote.

The second ballot took place on 16 October 2011. Hollande won with 56% of the vote to Aubry's 43% and thus became the official Socialist and Radical Left Party candidate for the 2012 presidential election. All his main opponents in the primary – Aubry, Ségolène Royal, Arnaud Montebourg, and Manuel Valls – pledged their support to him for the general election.

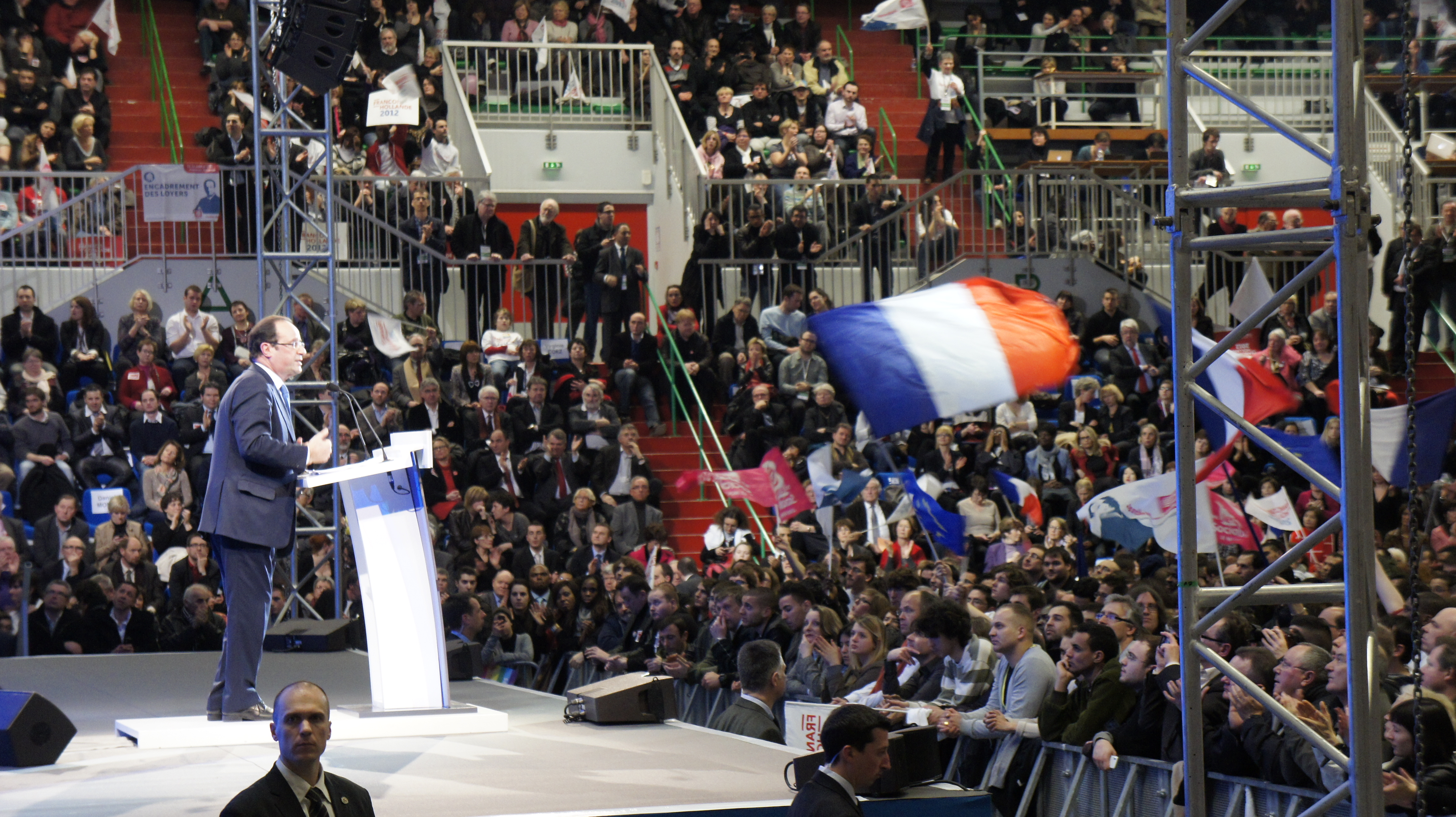
Hollande campaigning in Reims, 2012

Hollande's presidential campaign was managed by Pierre Moscovici and Stéphane Le Foll, a member of Parliament and Member of the European Parliament respectively. Hollande launched his campaign officially with a rally and major speech at Le Bourget on 22 January 2012 in front of 25,000 people. The main themes of his speech were equality and the regulation of finance, both of which he promised to make a key part of his campaign.

On 26 January, he outlined a full list of policies in a manifesto containing 60 propositions, including the separation of retail activities from riskier investment-banking businesses; raising taxes on big corporations, banks and the wealthy; creating 60,000 teaching jobs; bringing the official retirement age back down to 60 from 62; creating subsidised jobs in areas of high unemployment for the young; promoting more industry in France by creating a public investment bank; granting marriage and adoption rights to same-sex couples; and pulling French troops out of Afghanistan in 2012. On 9 February, he detailed his policies specifically relating to education in a major speech in Orléans.

Incumbent President Nicolas Sarkozy announced on 15 February that he would run for a second and final term, strongly criticising the Socialist proposals and claiming that Hollande would bring about "economic disaster within two days of taking office". Opinion polls showed a tight race between the two men in the first round of voting, with most polls showing Hollande comfortably ahead of Sarkozy in a hypothetical second round. The first round of the presidential election was held on 22 April. François Hollande came in first place with 28.63% of the vote, and faced Nicolas Sarkozy in a run-off. In the second round of voting on 6 May 2012, Hollande was elected with 51.6% of the vote.

== President of France (2012–2017) ==
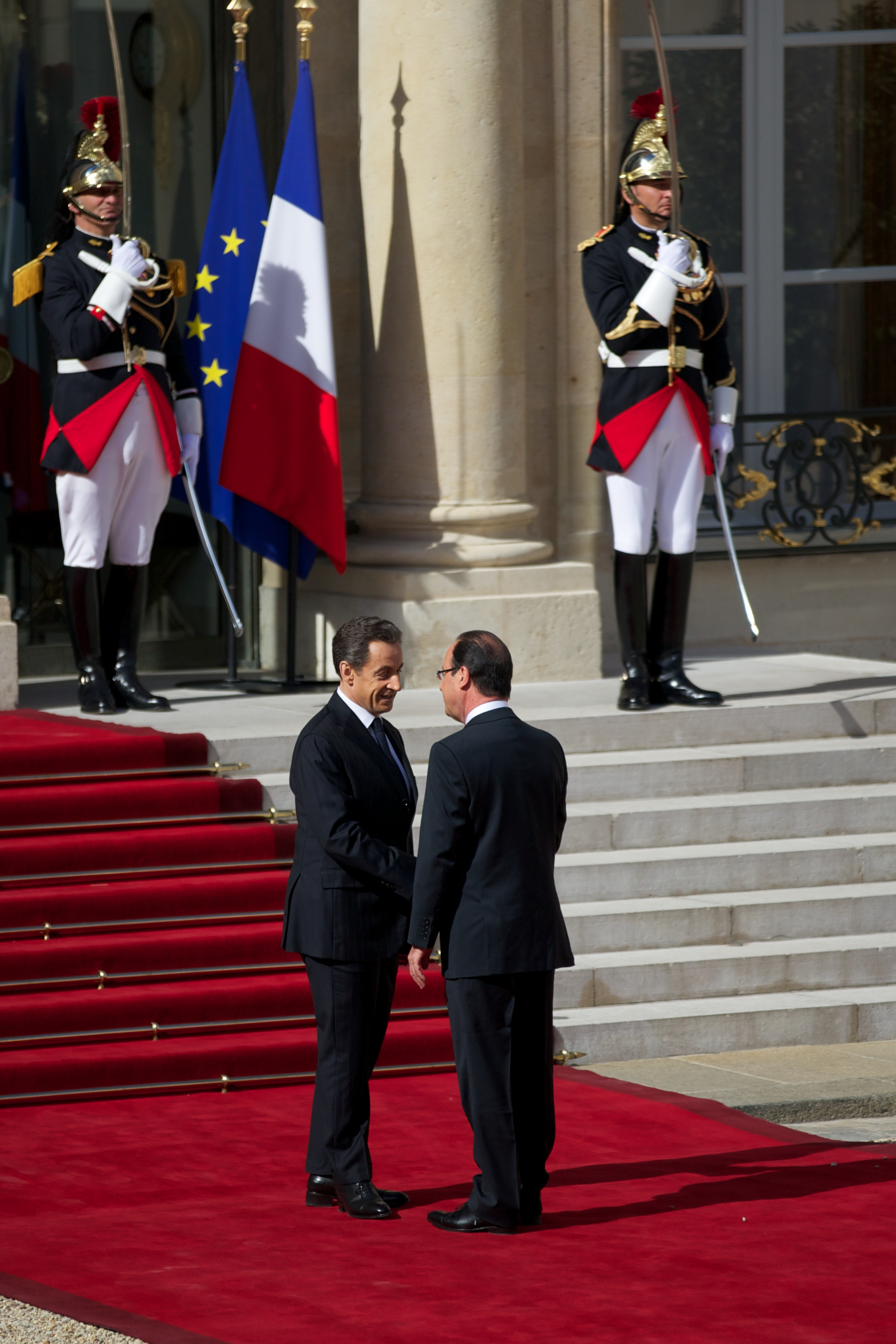
Hollande (right) and outgoing President Nicolas Sarkozy at Élysée Palace on inauguration day, 15 May 2012

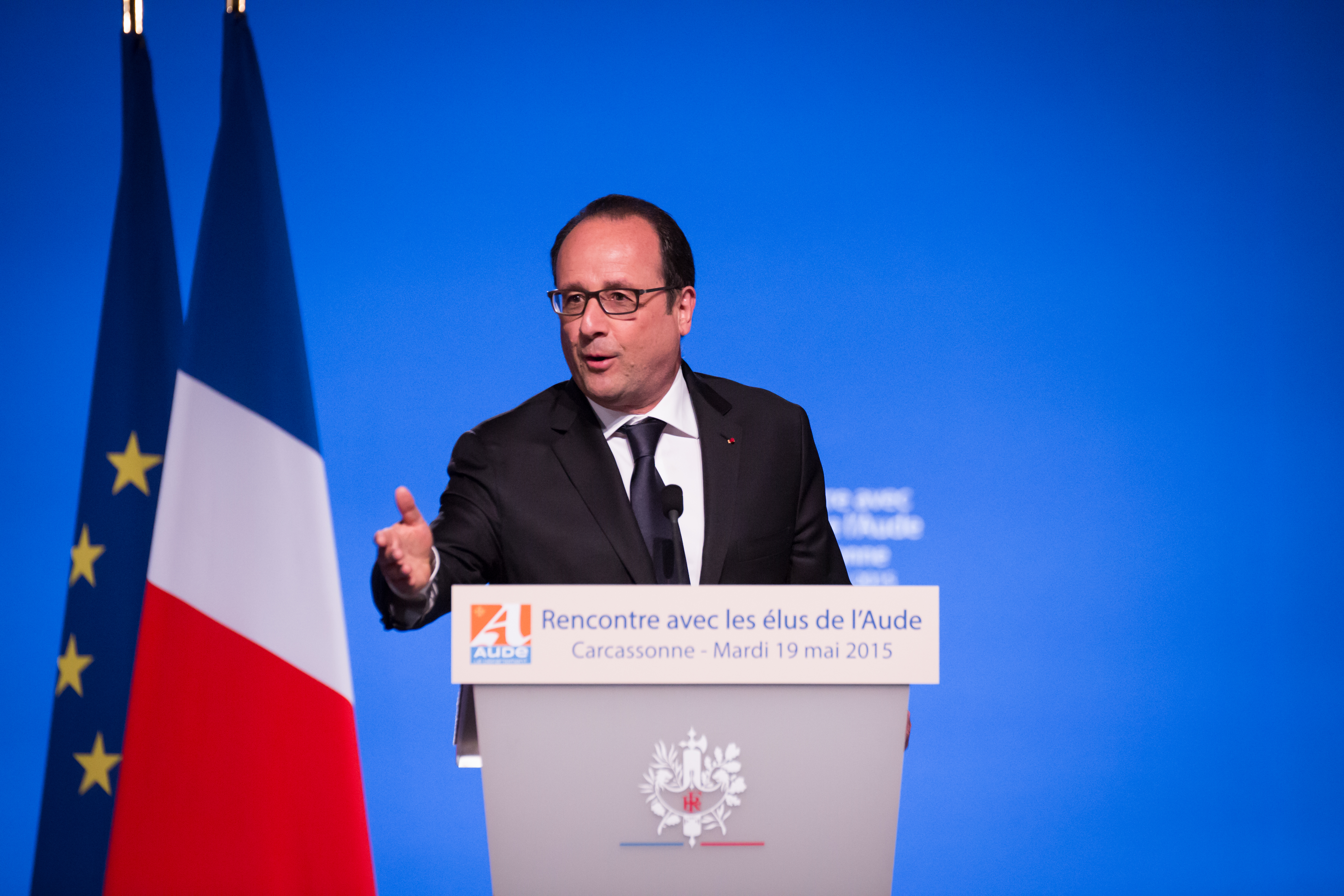
Hollande during a meeting in Carcassonne in May 2015

Hollande was inaugurated on 15 May 2012, and shortly afterwards appointed Jean-Marc Ayrault to be his Prime Minister. He was the first Socialist Party president since François Mitterrand left office in 1995. The President of the French Republic is one of the two joint heads of state of the Principality of Andorra. Hollande hosted a visit from Antoni Martí, head of the government, and Vicenç Mateu Zamora, leader of the parliament.

He also appointed Benoît Puga to be the military's chief of staff, Pierre-René Lemas as his general secretary and Pierre Besnard as his Head of Cabinet. Hollande's full Council of Ministers became the first ever in France to show gender parity, with 17 men and 17 women, and each member was required to sign a new "code of ethics" that placed significant restrictions on their conduct and compensation, above that of existing law. The first measure enacted by the new government was to lower the salaries of the President, the Prime Minister, and other members of the government by 30%.

=== Budget ===
Hollande's economic policies are wide-ranging, including supporting the creation of a European credit rating agency, the separation of lending and investment in banks, reducing the share of electricity generated by nuclear power in France from 75 to 50% in favour of renewable energy sources, merging income tax and the General Social Contribution (CSG), creating an additional 45% for additional income of 150,000 euros, capping tax loopholes at a maximum of €10,000 per year, and questioning the relief solidarity tax on wealth (ISF, Impôt de Solidarité sur la Fortune) measure that should bring €29 billion in additional revenue. Hollande also signalled his intent to implement a 75% income tax rate on revenue earned above 1,000,000 euros per year, to generate the provision of development funds for deprived suburbs, and to return to a deficit of zero per cent of GDP by 2017. The tax plan proved controversial, with courts ruling it unconstitutional in 2012, only to then take the opposite position on a redrafted version in 2013.

Hollande had also announced several reforms to education, pledging to recruit 60,000 new teachers, to create a study allowance and means-tested training, and to set up a mutually beneficial contract that would allow a generation of experienced employees and craftsmen to be the guardians and teachers of younger newly hired employees, thereby creating a total of 150,000 subsidized jobs. This was complemented by the promise of aid to SMEs, with the creation of a public bank investment-oriented SME's, and a reduction of the corporate tax rate to 30% for medium corporations and 15% for small.

Hollande's government has announced plans to construct 500,000 public homes per year, including 150,000 social houses, funded by a doubling of the ceiling of the Livret A, the region making available its local government land within five years. In accordance with long-standing Socialist Party policy, Hollande has announced that the retirement age will revert to 60, for those who have contributed for more than 41 years.

=== Marriage and adoption for same-sex couples ===
Hollande has also announced his personal support for same-sex marriage and adoption for LGBT couples, and outlined plans to pursue the issue in early 2013. In July 2012, Prime Minister Jean-Marc Ayrault announced that "In the first half of 2013, the right to marriage and adoption will be open to all couples, without discrimination", confirming this election promise by Hollande. The bill to legalise same-sex marriage, known as Bill no. 344, was introduced to the National Assembly on 7 November 2012. On 12 February 2013, the National Assembly approved the bill in a 329–229 vote. The Right-wing opposed the bill. The Senate approved the full bill with a 171–165 majority on 12 April with minor amendments. On 23 April, the National Assembly approved the amended bill, in a 331–225 vote, and following approval of the law by the Constitutional Council of France, it was signed into law by President Hollande on 18 May 2013, with the first same-sex weddings under the law taking place eleven days later.

=== Labour reform ===
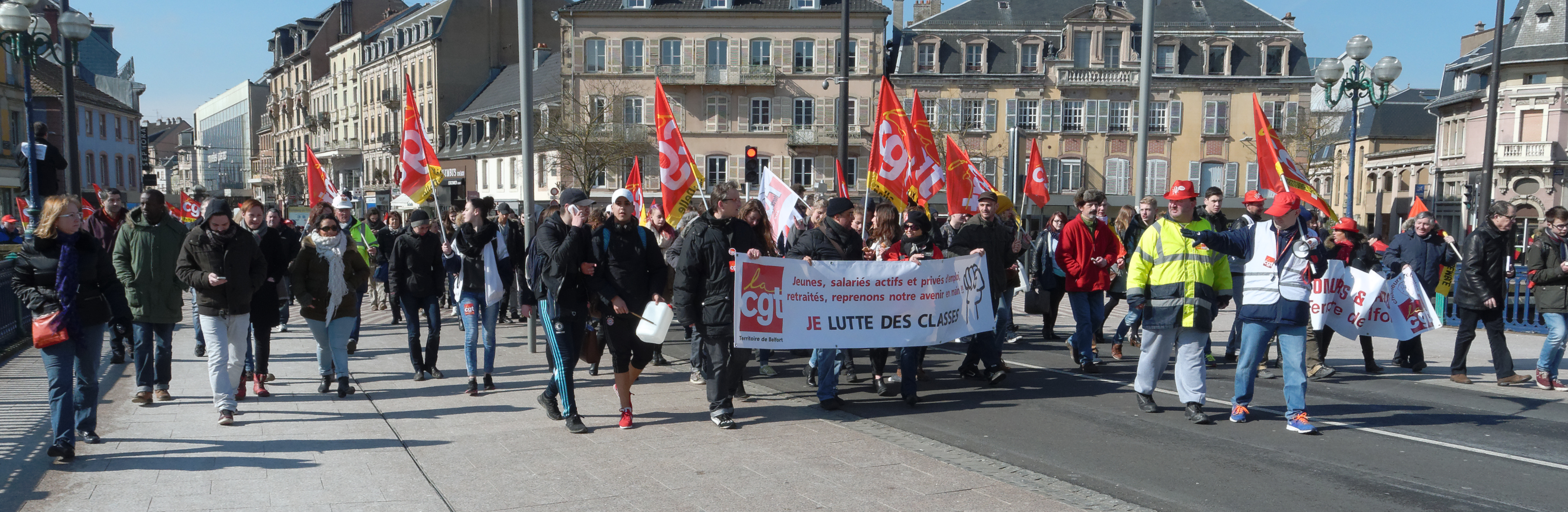
Demonstration against Hollande's labour reform by the CGT in Belfort, 2016

As President, Hollande pursued labour reform to make France more competitive internationally. Legislation for this, introduced in late 2012, after much debate passed the French lower and upper house in May 2013. The bill included measures such as making it easier for workers to change jobs and for companies to fire employees. One of the main measures of the bill allowed companies to temporarily cut workers' salaries or hours during times of economic difficulty. This measure took its inspiration from Germany, where furloughs have been credited with allowing companies to weather difficult times without resorting to massive layoffs. Layoffs in France are often challenged in courts and the cases can take years to resolve. Many companies cite the threat of lengthy court action – even more than any financial cost – as the most difficult part of doing business in France. The law shortens the time that employees have to contest a layoff and also lays out a scheme for severance pay. The government hopes this will help employees and companies reach agreement faster in contentious layoffs.

Another key measure introduced was credits for training that follow employees throughout their career, regardless of where they work, and the right to take a leave of absence to work at another company. The law will also require all companies to offer and partially pay for supplemental health insurance. Lastly, the law also reforms unemployment insurance, so that someone out of work doesn't risk foregoing significant benefits when taking a job that might pay less than previous work or end up only being temporary. Under the new law, workers will be able to essentially put benefits on hold when they take temporary work, instead of seeing their benefits recalculated each time.

=== Pension reform ===
As President, Hollande pursued reform to the pension system in France. The process proved to be very contentious, with members of Parliament, Labor Unions, and general public all opposed. Mass protests and demonstrations occurred throughout Paris. Despite the opposition, the French Parliament did pass a reform in December 2013 aimed at plugging a pension deficit expected to reach 20.7 billion euros ($28.4 billion) by 2020 if nothing were to be done. Rather than raising the mandatory retirement age, as many economists had advised, Hollande pursued increases in contributions, leaving the retirement age untouched. The reform had a rough ride in parliament, being rejected twice by the Senate, where Hollande's Socialist Party has a slim majority, before it won sufficient backing in a final vote before the lower house of parliament. French private sector workers saw the size and duration of their pension contributions increase only modestly under the reform while their retirement benefits were largely untouched.

=== Foreign affairs ===
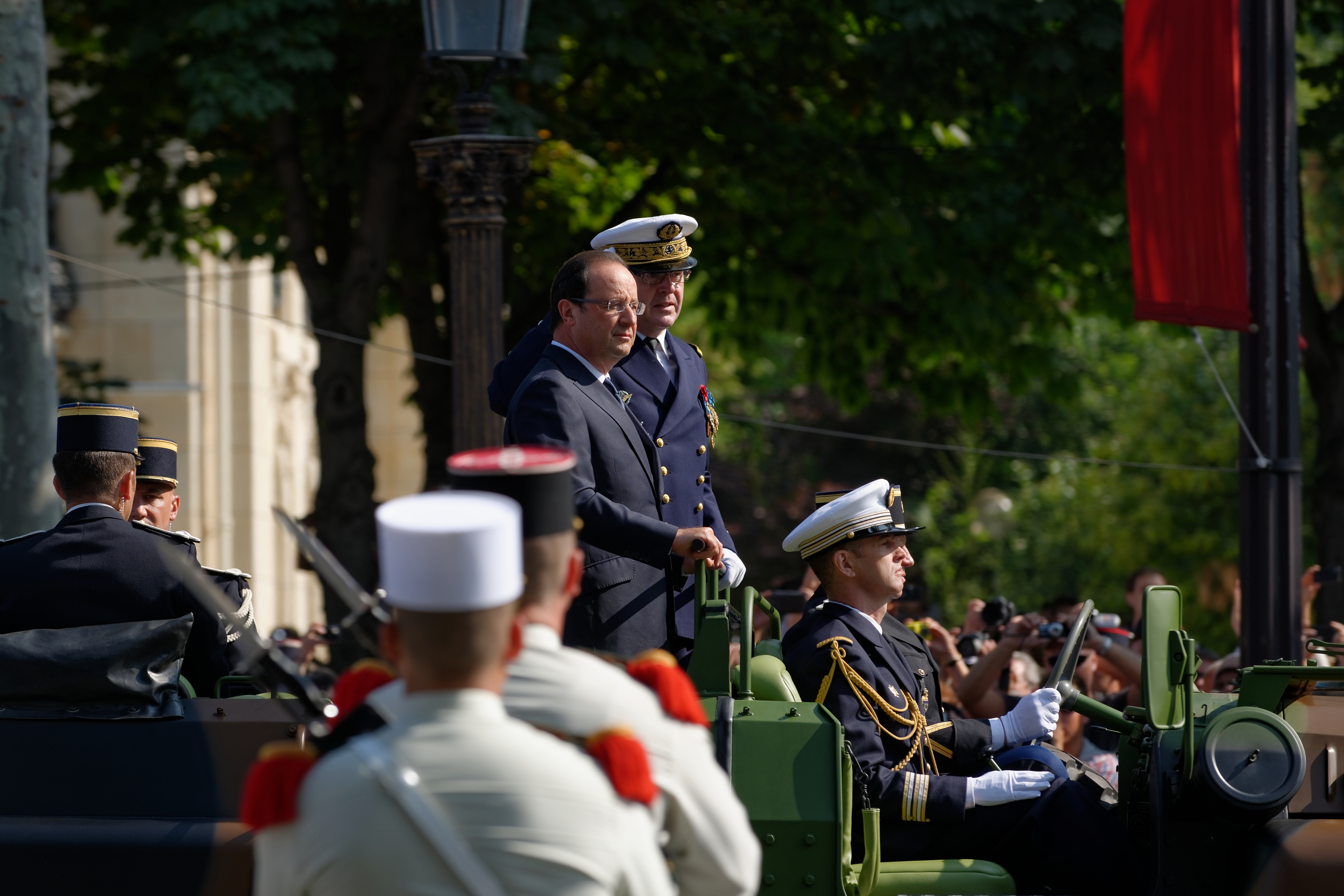
Hollande reviewing troops during the 2013 Bastille Day military parade

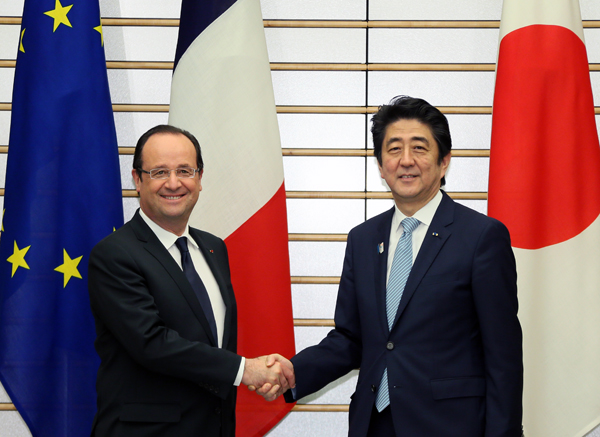
Hollande with Japanese Prime Minister Shinzo Abe in Tokyo on 7 June 2013

As President, Hollande promised an early withdrawal of French combat troops present in Afghanistan in 2012. He also pledged to conclude a new contract of Franco-German partnership, advocating the adoption of a Directive on the protection of public services. Hollande has proposed "an acceleration of the establishment of a Franco-German civic service, the creation of a Franco-German research office, the creation of a Franco-German industrial fund to finance common competitiveness clusters, and the establishment of a common military headquarters". As well as this, Hollande has expressed a wish to "combine the positions of the presidents of the European Commission and of the European Council (currently held by José Manuel Barroso and Herman Van Rompuy respectively) into a single office [...] and that it should be directly chosen" by the members of the European Parliament.

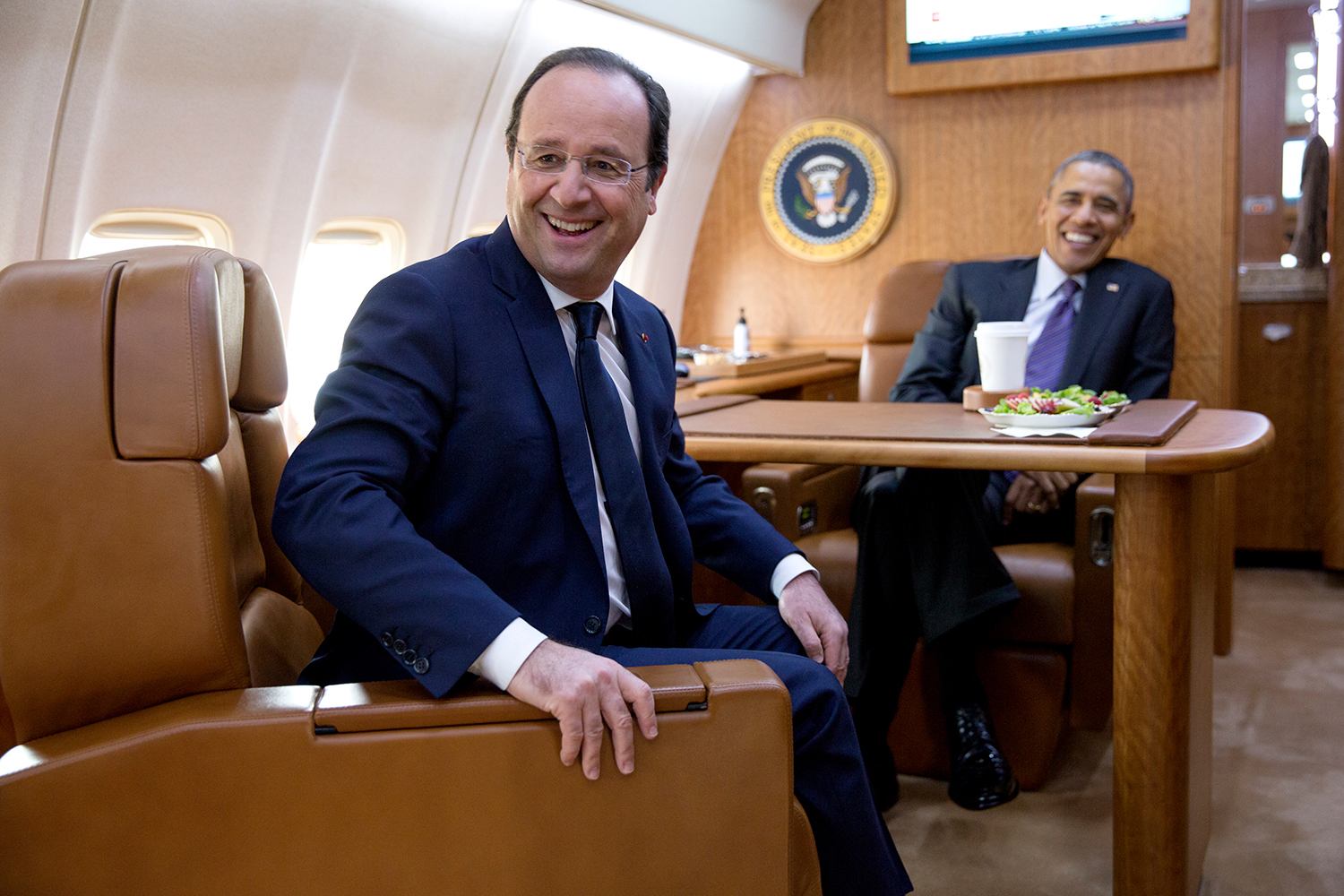
Hollande and Barack Obama on board Air Force One, 10 February 2014

On 11 January 2013, Hollande authorised the execution of Operation Serval, which aimed to curtail the activities of Islamist extremists in the north of Mali. The intervention was popularly supported in Mali, as Hollande promised that his government would do all it could to "rebuild Mali". During his one-day visit to Bamako, Mali's capital, on 2 February 2013, he said that it was "the most important day in [his] political life". In 2014, Hollande took some of these troops out of Mali and spread them over the rest of the Sahel under Operation Barkhane, in an effort to curb jihadist militants. On 27 February 2014, Hollande was a special guest of honor in Abuja, received by Nigerian President Goodluck Jonathan in celebration of Nigeria's amalgamation in 1914, a 100-year anniversary. In July 2014, Hollande expressed support for Israel's right to defend itself during the 2014 Israel–Gaza conflict, and told Israeli Prime Minister Benjamin Netanyahu, "France strongly condemns these aggressions [by Hamas]."

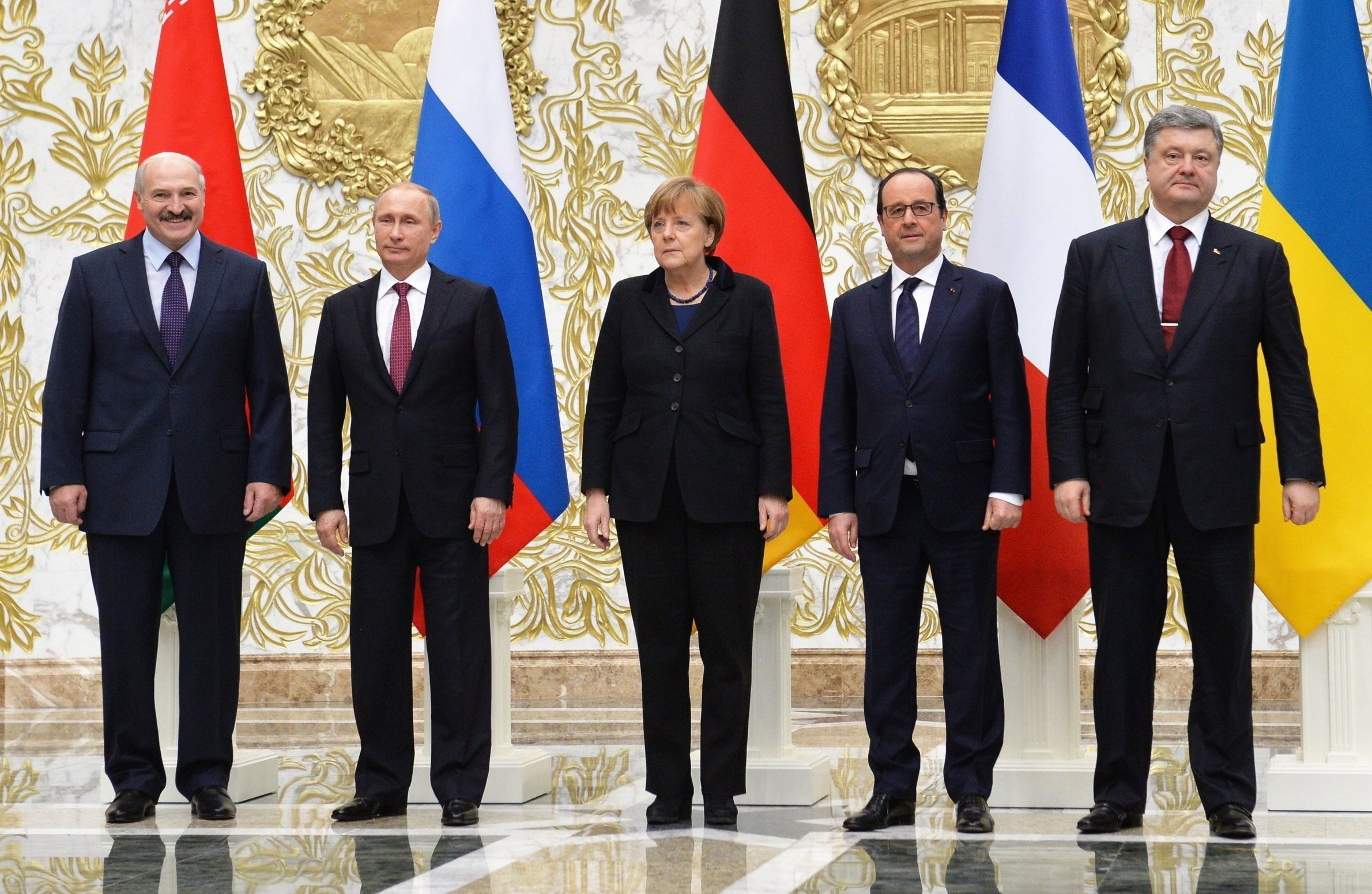
Leaders of Belarus, Russia, Germany, France, and Ukraine at the Minsk II summit, 11–12 February 2015

In September 2015, Hollande warned former Eastern Bloc countries against rejecting the EU mandatory migrant quotas, saying: "Those who don't share our values, those who don't even want to respect those principles, need to start asking themselves questions about their place in the European Union".

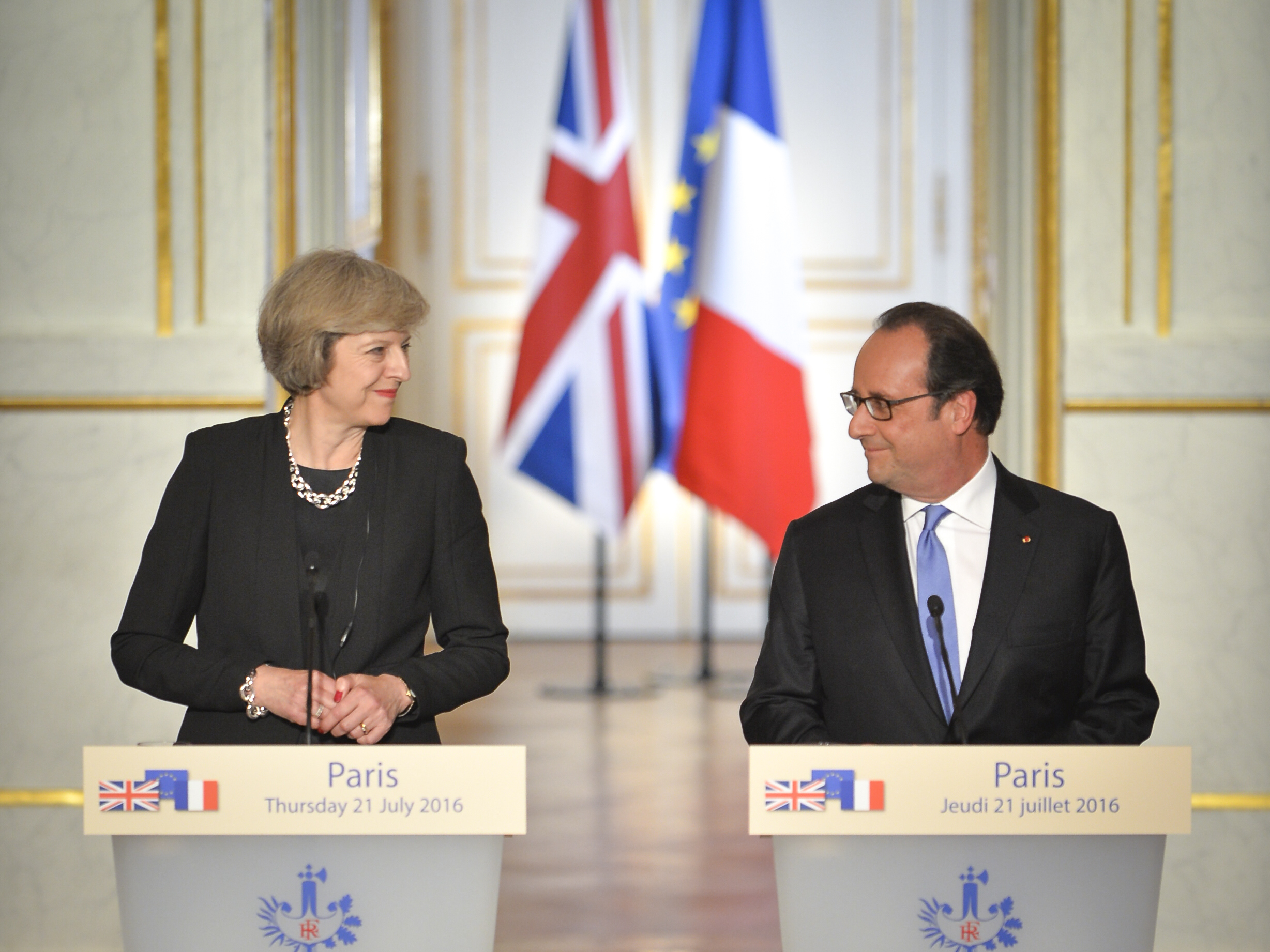
Hollande with British Prime Minister Theresa May in Paris on 21 July 2016

Hollande supported the Saudi Arabian-led intervention in Yemen, re-supplying the Saudi military. France authorised $18 billion (€16 billion) in arms sales to Saudi Arabia in 2015.

In 2014, French bank BNP Paribas agreed to pay an $8.9 billion fine, the largest ever for violating U.S. sanctions against Iran at that time. In October 2016, Hollande said: "When the (European) Commission goes after Google or digital giants which do not pay the taxes they should in Europe, America takes offence. And yet, they quite shamelessly demand 8 billion from BNP or 5 billion from Deutsche Bank."

=== Approval ratings ===
An IFOP poll released in April 2014 showed that Hollande's approval rating had dropped five points since the previous month of March to 18%, dipping below his earlier low of 20% in February during the same year. In November 2014, his approval rating reached a new low of 12%, according to a YouGov poll. Following the Charlie Hebdo shooting in January 2015, however, approval for Hollande increased dramatically, reaching 40% according to an IFOP poll two weeks after the attack, though an Ipsos-Le Point survey in early February showed his rating declining back to 30%.

Hollande ultimately registered the least popularity for a president of the French Fifth Republic. In September 2014, his approval rating was down to 13% according to an IFOP/JDD survey. One year before the end of his mandate, in April 2016, his approval rating was placed at 14%, and surveys predicted that if he were to run for a second term, he would be defeated in the first round of the 2017 presidential elections. In November 2016, a poll found Hollande's approval rating to be just 4%.

On 8 May 2012, Hollande took part in the commemorations of the end of the Second World War, alongside Nicolas Sarkozy, following the latter's invitation.

On 10 May 2012, the Constitutional Council announced the official results of the presidential election; and on 15 May 2012, the transfer of power took place.

== Post-presidency (2017–present) ==
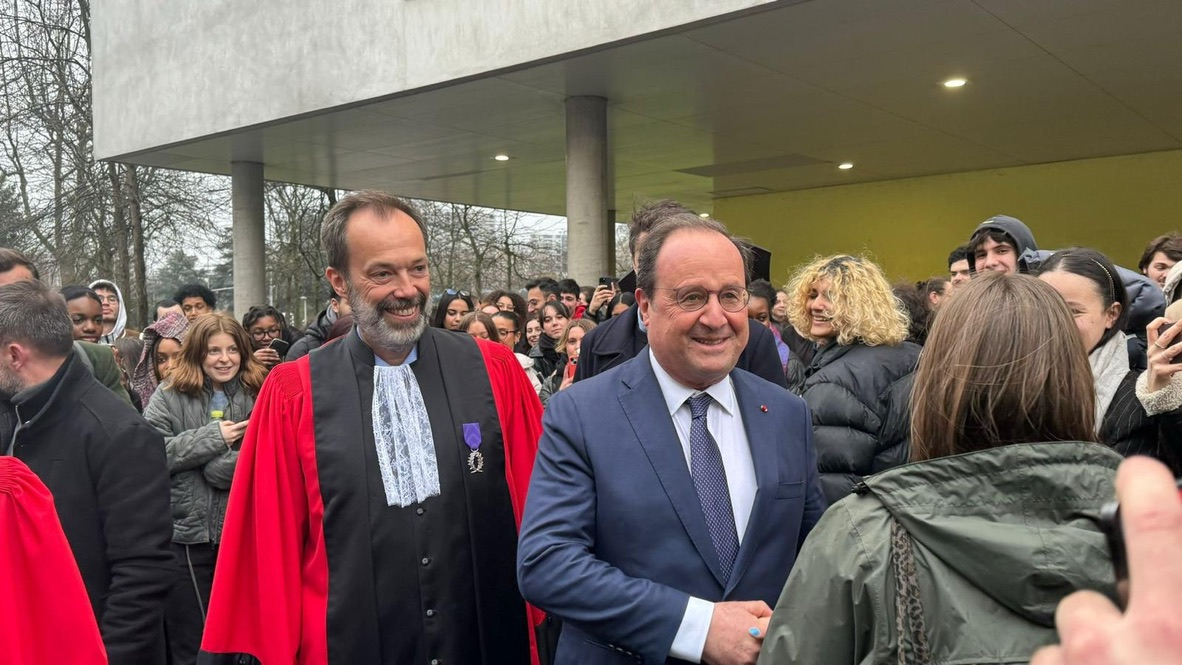
Former President Hollande at Créteil University in March 2024

While refusing to sit on the Constitutional Council, of which he is an ex-officio member, François Hollande continues to comment publicly on French and international political life through several books and university lectures.^{,} In his books, he is critical of the domestic policies of his successor Emmanuel Macron, but also of his former left-wing political rival Jean-Luc Mélenchon, who led the left-wing union in the 2022 legislative elections.

On 12 November 2023, he participated in the March for the Republic and Against Antisemitism in Paris in response to the rise in antisemitism since the start of the Gaza war.

=== Return to National Assembly (2024) ===
On 15 June 2024, Hollande announced his candidacy for the New Popular Front in the first constituency of Corrèze for the 2024 French legislative election. Hollande's decision to contest the election was considered surprising, including among fellow PS members.

He qualified, in first place, for a three-way second round against candidates from the National Rally and The Republicans, and was elected with 43 percent of the vote in the runoff.

== Personal life ==
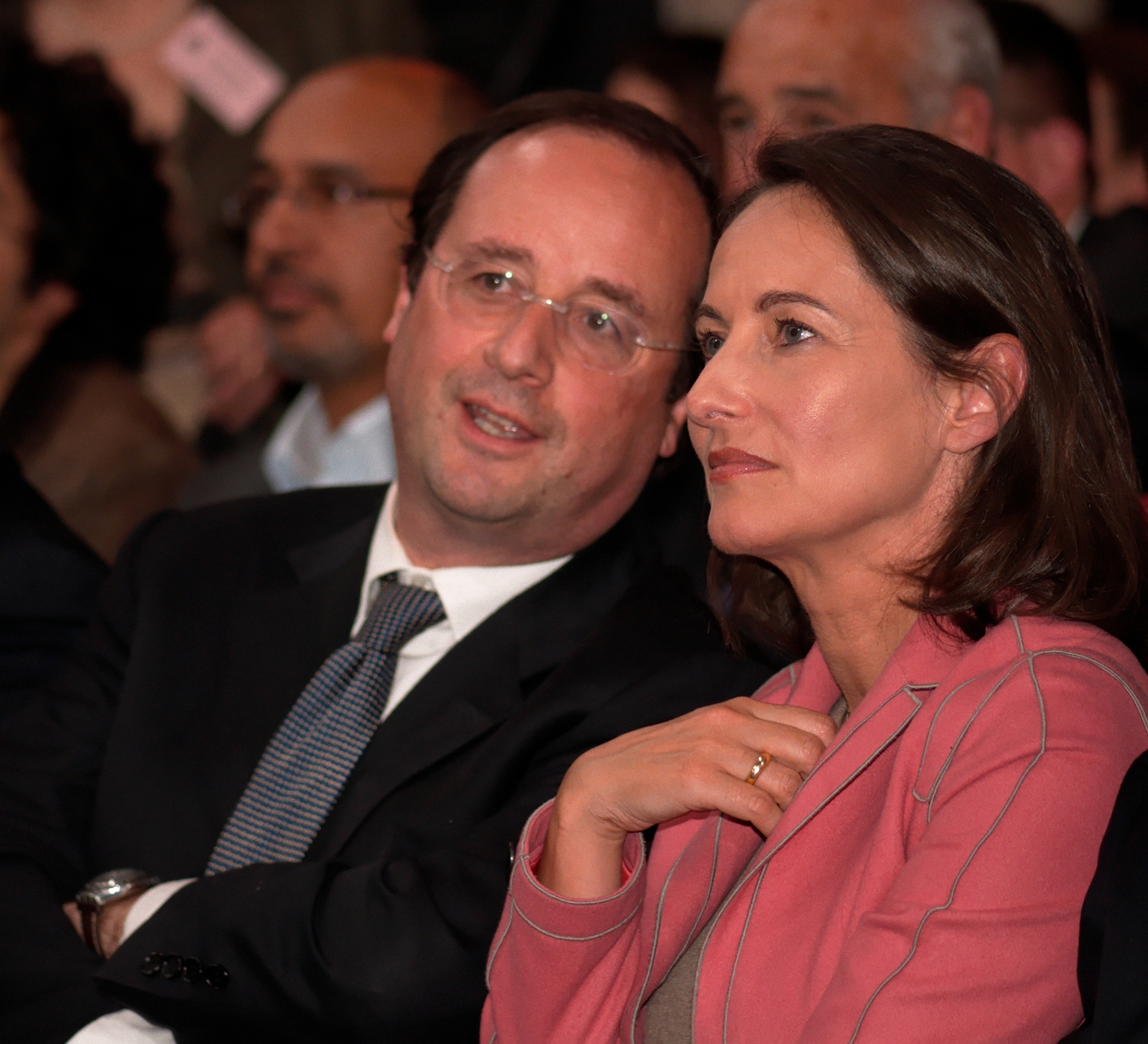
Hollande with his then-partner Ségolène Royal, at a rally for the 2007 elections

For twenty nine years, his partner was fellow Socialist politician Ségolène Royal. In June 2007, just a month after Royal's defeat in the French presidential election of 2007, the couple announced that they were separating.

A few months after his split from was announced, a French website published details of a relationship between Hollande and French journalist Valérie Trierweiler. In November 2007, Trierweiler confirmed and openly discussed her relationship with Hollande in an interview with the French weekly Télé 7 Jours. She remained a reporter for the magazine Paris Match, but ceased work on political stories. Trierweiler moved into the Élysée Palace with Hollande when he became president and started to accompany him on official travel.

On 25 January 2014, Hollande officially announced his separation from Valérie Trierweiler after the tabloid magazine Closer revealed his affair with actress Julie Gayet. In September 2014, Trierweiler published a book about her time with Hollande titled Merci pour ce moment (Thank You for This Moment). The memoir claimed the president presented himself as disliking the rich, but in reality disliked the poor. The claim brought an angry reaction and rejection from Hollande, who said he had spent his life dedicated to the under-privileged.

On 4 June 2022, Hollande married Gayet in Tulle.

Hollande was raised Catholic, but became an agnostic later in life. He now considers himself to be an atheist, but still professes respect for all religious practices.

Hollande is commonly nicknamed Flanby, a popular dessert similar to flan, as it embodies a political wobbliness and pudginess often attributed to him by his critics.

== Honours and decorations ==
=== National honours ===
Ribbon bar	Honour	Date & Comment
	Grand Cross of the National Order of the Legion of Honour	15 May 2012 – automatic upon taking presidential office
	Grand Cross of the National Order of Merit	15 May 2012 – automatic upon taking presidential office

=== Foreign honours ===
Ribbon bar	Country	Honour	Date
Holy See	Holy See	Proto-canon of the Papal Basilica of St. John Lateran (2012–2017; the post is held ex officio by the French Head of State)	15 May 2012 - 14 May 2017
	Poland	Knight of the Order of the White Eagle	16 November 2012
	Italy	Knight Grand Cross with Collar of the Order of Merit of the Italian Republic	21 November 2012
	Senegal	Grand Cross of the National Order of the Lion	27 November 2012
	Brazil	Collar of the Order of the Southern Cross	12 December 2012
	UAE	Collar of the Order of Zayed	15 January 2013
	Morocco	Grand Collar of the Order of Muhammad	3 April 2013
	Panama	Grand Cross of the Order of Vasco Nunez de Balboa	24 May 2013
	Japan	Grand Cordon of the Order of the Chrysanthemum	13 June 2013
	Tunisia	Grand Cordon of the Order of the Republic of Tunisia	4 July 2013
	Finland	Grand Cross with Collar of the Order of the White Rose of Finland	9 July 2013
	Germany	Grand Cross Special Class of the Order of Merit of the Federal Republic of Germany	3 September 2013
	Palestine	Grand Collar of the State of Palestine	13 September 2013
	Mali	Grand Cordon of the National Order of Mali of Mali	20 September 2013
	Slovakia	Grand Cross of the Order of the White Double Cross	29 October 2013
	Austria	Grand Star of the Decoration of Honour for Services to the Republic of Austria	5 November 2013
	Monaco	Knight Grand Cross of the Order of Saint-Charles	14 November 2013
Order of King Abdulaziz, 1st Class (Saudi Arabia)	KSA	Collar of the Order of Abdulaziz Al Saud	30 December 2013
	Netherlands	Knight Grand Cross of the Order of the Netherlands Lion	20 January 2014
	Belgium	Grand Cordon of the Order of Leopold	3 February 2014
	Mexico	Collar of the Order of the Aztec Eagle	10 April 2014
	United Kingdom	Honorary Knight Grand Cross of the Order of the Bath	5 June 2014
	Niger	Grand Cross of the National Order of Niger	15 July 2014
	Ivory Coast	Grand Cross of the National Order of the Ivory Coast	17 July 2014
	Armenia	Grand Cordon of the Order of Glory	12 October 2014
Grand Officer National Order of Québec Undress ribbon	Canada	Grand officier of the National Order of Quebec	3 November 2014
	Guinea	Grand Cross of the National Order of Merit	26 November 2014
	Sweden	Knight of the Royal Order of the Seraphim	2 December 2014
	Luxembourg	Knight of the Order of the Gold Lion of the House of Nassau	6 March 2015
	Spain	Knight of the Collar of the Order of Isabella the Catholic	23 March 2015
	Benin	Grand Cross of the National Order of Benin	30 June 2015
	Greece	Grand Cross of the Order of the Redeemer	22 October 2015
	Kazakhstan	Member 1st class of the Order of Friendship	6 November 2015
	Peru	Grand Cross of the Order of the Sun of Peru	25 February 2016
	Argentina	Grand Cross of the Order of the Liberator General San Martín	25 February 2016
CAR Ordre de la Reconnaissance Centrafricaine GC ribbon	Central African Republic	Grand Cross of the Order of Central African recognition	13 May 2016
	Uruguay	Medal of the Oriental Republic of Uruguay	30 May 2016
PRT Order of Liberty - Grand Collar BAR	Portugal	Grand Collar of the Order of Liberty	19 June 2016
	Romania	Grand Collar of the Order of the Star of Romania	13 September 2016
	Colombia	Grand Cross of the Order of Boyaca	25 January 2017
	Ukraine	Member of the Order of Liberty	1 October 2018
	Albania	Grand Cross of the Order of Public Gratitude	26 July 2026

=== Key to the City ===
Manila: Freedom of the City of Manila (26 February 2015).

== Works ==
Hollande has had a number of books and academic works published, including:

- L'Heure des choix. Pour une économie politique (The hour of choices. For a political economy), with Pierre Moscovici, 1991. ISBN 2-7381-0146-1
- L'Idée socialiste aujourd'hui (The Socialist Idea Today), Omnibus, 2001. ISBN 978-2-259-19584-3
- Devoirs de vérité (Duties of truth), interviews with Edwy Plenel, éd. Stock, 2007. ISBN 978-2-234-05934-4
- Droit d'inventaires (Rights of inventory), interviews with Pierre Favier, Le Seuil, 2009. ISBN 978-2-02-097913-9
- Le rêve français (The French Dream), Privat, August 2011. ISBN 978-2-7089-4441-1
- Un destin pour la France (A Destiny for France), Fayard, January 2012. ISBN 978-2-213-66283-1
- Changer de destin (Changing destiny), Robert Laffont, February 2012. ISBN 978-2-221-13117-6
- Les leçons du pouvoir (The lessons of power), Stock, 2018. EAN 9782234084971
- Bouleversements: Pour comprendre la nouvelle donne mondiale, September, 2022. ISBN 978-2-234-09399-7
- Affronter (clash), stock, October 2021. EAN 9782234087262

National Assembly
New constituency	Member of the National Assembly for Corrèze's 1st constituency 1988–1993; 1997–2012; 2024–present	Succeeded by Raymond-Max Aubert
Preceded by Lucien Renaudie	Member of the National Assembly for Corrèze's 1st constituency 1988–1993; 1997–2012; 2024–present	Succeeded by Sophie Dessus
Preceded by Francis Dubois	Member of the National Assembly for Corrèze's 1st constituency 1988–1993; 1997–2012; 2024–present	Incumbent
European Parliament
Proportional representation	Member of the European Parliament for France; 1999	Proportional representation
Political offices
Preceded by Raymond-Max Aubert	Mayor of Tulle; 2001–2008	Succeeded by Bernard Combes
Preceded by Jean-Pierre Dupont	President of the Corrèze General Council; 2008–2012	Succeeded by Gérard Bonnet
Preceded by Nicolas Sarkozy	President of France; 2012–2017	Succeeded by Emmanuel Macron
Party political offices
Preceded by Lionel Jospin	First Secretary of the Socialist Party; 1997–2008	Succeeded by Martine Aubry
Preceded by Ségolène Royal	Socialist Party nominee for President of France; 2012	Succeeded by Benoît Hamon
Catholic Church titles
Preceded by Nicolas Sarkozy	Honorary Canon of the Papal Basilicas of St. John Lateran and St. Peter; 2012–2017	Succeeded by Emmanuel Macron
Regnal titles
Preceded by Nicolas Sarkozy	Co-Prince of Andorra; 2012–2017; Served alongside: Joan Enric Vives Sicília	Succeeded by Emmanuel Macron
Order of precedence
Preceded by Nicolas Sarkozy as former President of the Republic	Order of precedence of France; Former President of the Republic	Succeeded by Laurent Nuñez as Minister of the Interior
