= Allassac =

- Commune
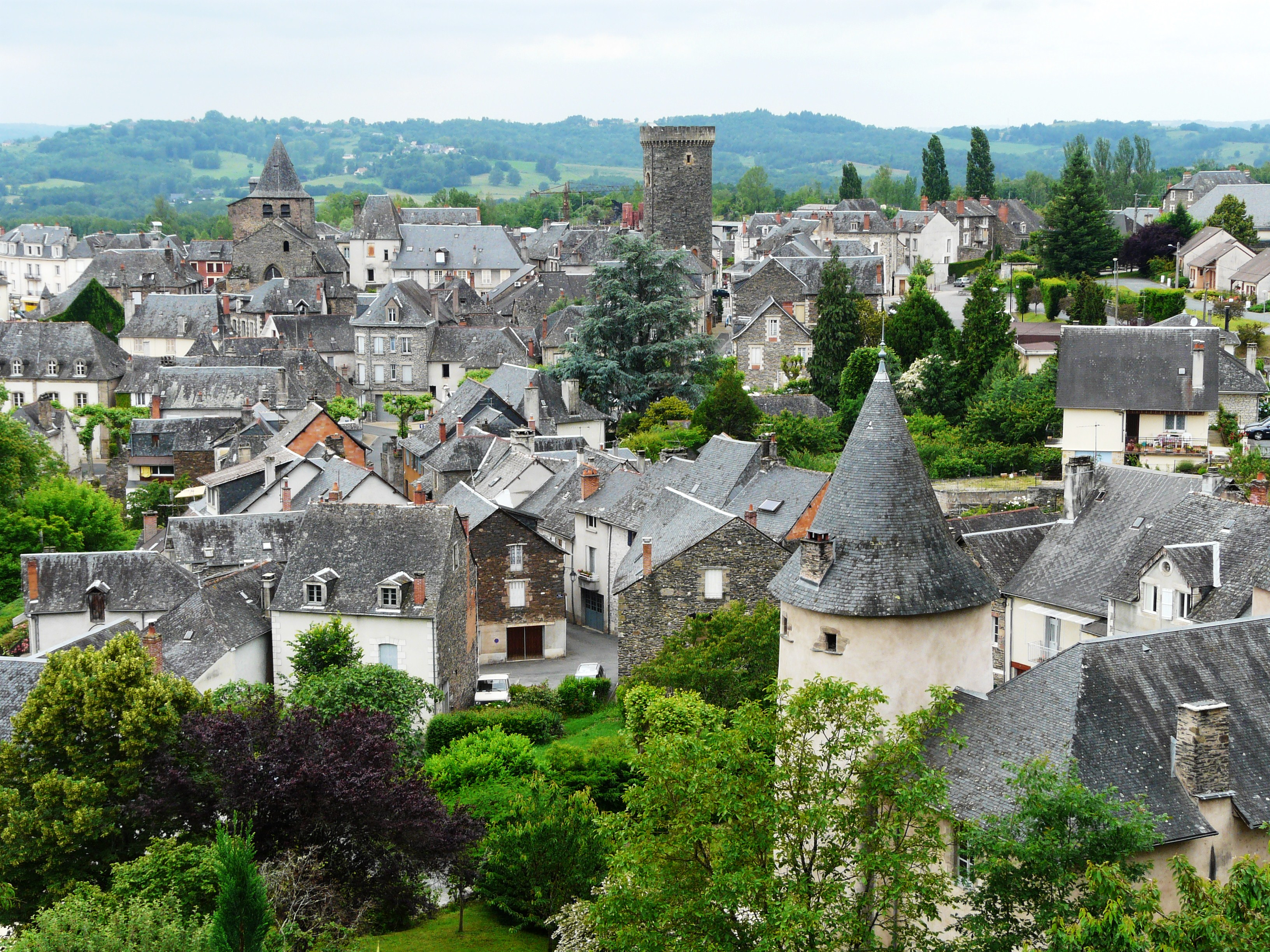
- A general view of Allassac

- Coat of arms
- Location of Allassac
- Location within France Location within Nouvelle-Aquitaine
- Coordinates: 45°15′33″N 1°28′35″E
- Country: France
- Region: Nouvelle-Aquitaine
- Department: Corrèze
- Arrondissement: Brive-la-Gaillarde
- Canton: Allassac
- Intercommunality: Bassin de Brive

Government
  - Mayor (2020–2026): Jean-Louis Lascaux
- Area^{1}: 39.01 km^{2} (15.06 sq mi)
- Elevation: 170 m (560 ft)
- Highest elevation: 387 m (1,270 ft)
- Lowest elevation: 103 m (338 ft)
- Population (2023): 4,081
  - Density: 104.6/km^{2} (270.9/sq mi)
- Time zone: UTC+01:00 (CET)
  - Summer (DST): UTC+02:00 (CEST)
- INSEE/Postal code: 19005 /19240
- ^{1} French Land Register data, which excludes lakes, ponds, glaciers > 1 km^{2} (0.386 sq mi or 247 acres) and river estuaries.

Allassac (French pronunciation: [alasak]; Occitan: Alaçac) is a commune in the Corrèze department in the Nouvelle-Aquitaine region of central France.

The commune has been awarded three flowers by the National Council of Towns and Villages in Bloom in the Competition of cities and villages in Bloom.

== Geography ==
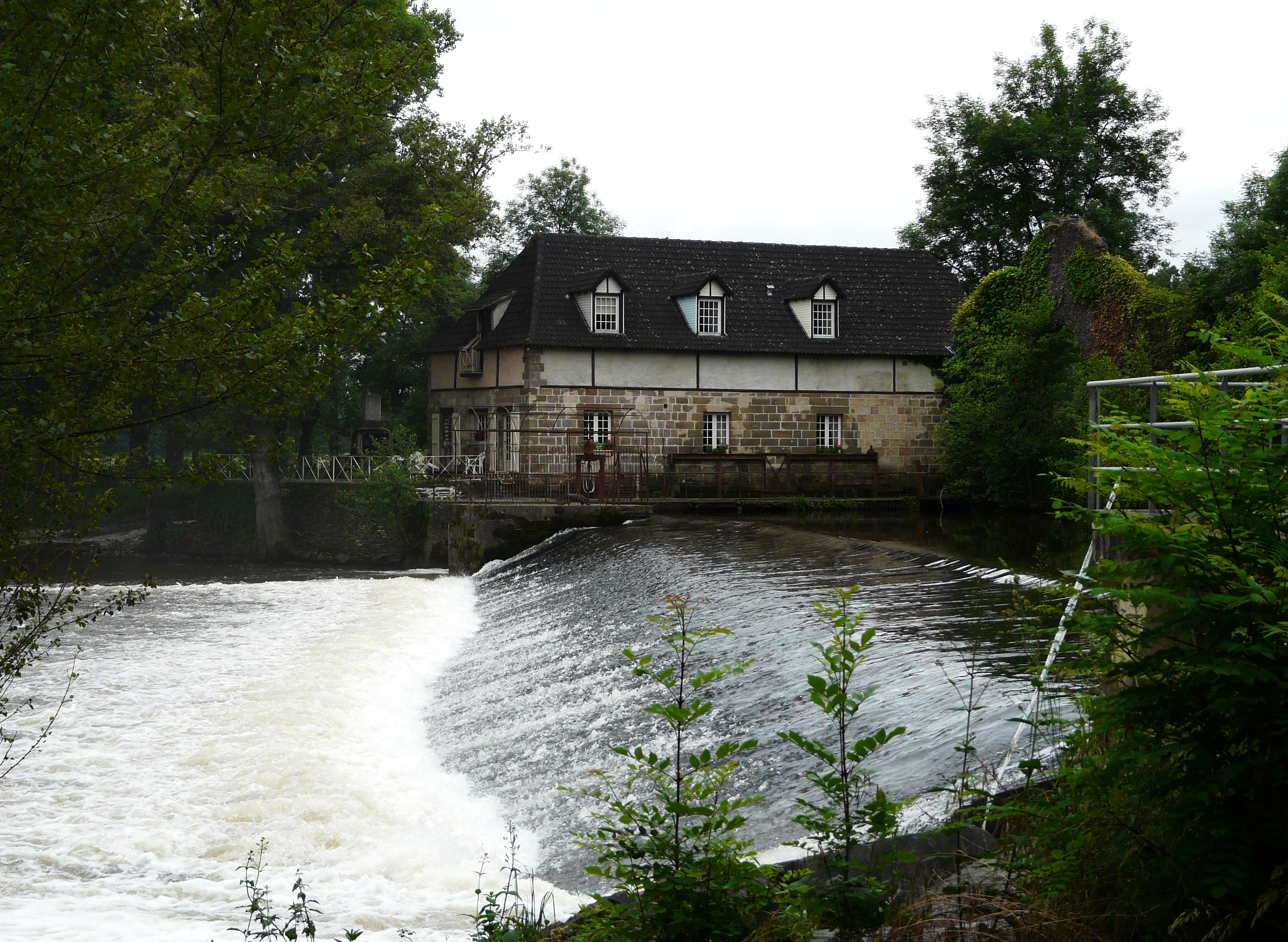
The dam and the old mill on the Vézère at Garavet

Located in the Brive Basin, the commune of Allassac is irrigated by three major rivers in the north–south direction: the Vézère and its tributaries the Loyre and the Clan which is a sub-tributary of the Corrèze.

Allassac, like many surrounding communes, is part of Vézère Ardoise Country and benefits from the label French Towns and Lands of Art and History.

The town of Allassac is located at the intersection of departmental roads D9, D25, D34 and D134. Allassac station on the Orléans–Montauban railway line has rail connections to Brive-la-Gaillarde, Uzerche and Limoges. It is located, in orthodromic distances, 6 kilometres east of Objat and 12 kilometres north-west of Brive-la-Gaillarde.

The commune is also served by departmental roads D57, D148, and D901.

Four kilometres to the south-east, the A20 autoroute allows direct access to Allassac through Exit 48.

=== Hamlets ===
Apart from the town the commune has the following hamlets:

- La Bessiere
- Les Borderies
- Brochat
- La Chapelle
- La Chatroulle
- Le Colombier
- La Croix Saint-Joseph
- L'Escurotte
- Eyzac
- La Faurie
- Garavet
- Gauche
- Laujour
- Montaural
- La Pialeporchie
- Les Placeaux
- La Plaine de Garavet
- Le Pont Salomon
- Le Pos Delpy
- Le Puy
- Les Rebieres Blanche
- La Roche
- Le Saillant d'Allassac
- Le Saillant Vieux
- Verdier
- Verdier-Bas
- Verdier-Haut

Le Saillent

In Latin aqua saliens meaning "leaping water". The name evokes the rapids and a cascade into a deep gorge. It was called ad illo Salente in 904.

=== Neighbouring communes and villages ===
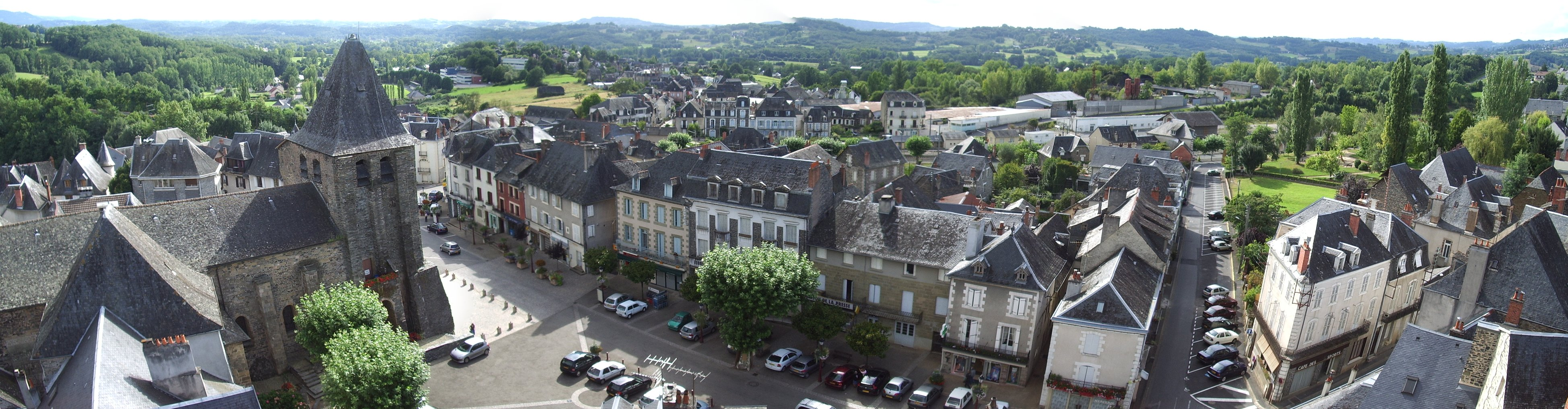
Place Allègre

== Toponymy ==
Allassac is derived from the Gallo-Roman word Alaciacus (the estate of Alacius). The first mention in the form Allassac was in the will of Aredius (Saint Yrieix). He called it Alaciaco in 947.

The village is identified as Alassac in the Grand Atlas of the kingdom of France established by Johannes Blaeu in the 17th century then in the Cassini map which represented France between 1756 and 1789. It was then Allassat until the beginning of the French Revolution before the final appearance of the current name in 1801.

== History ==
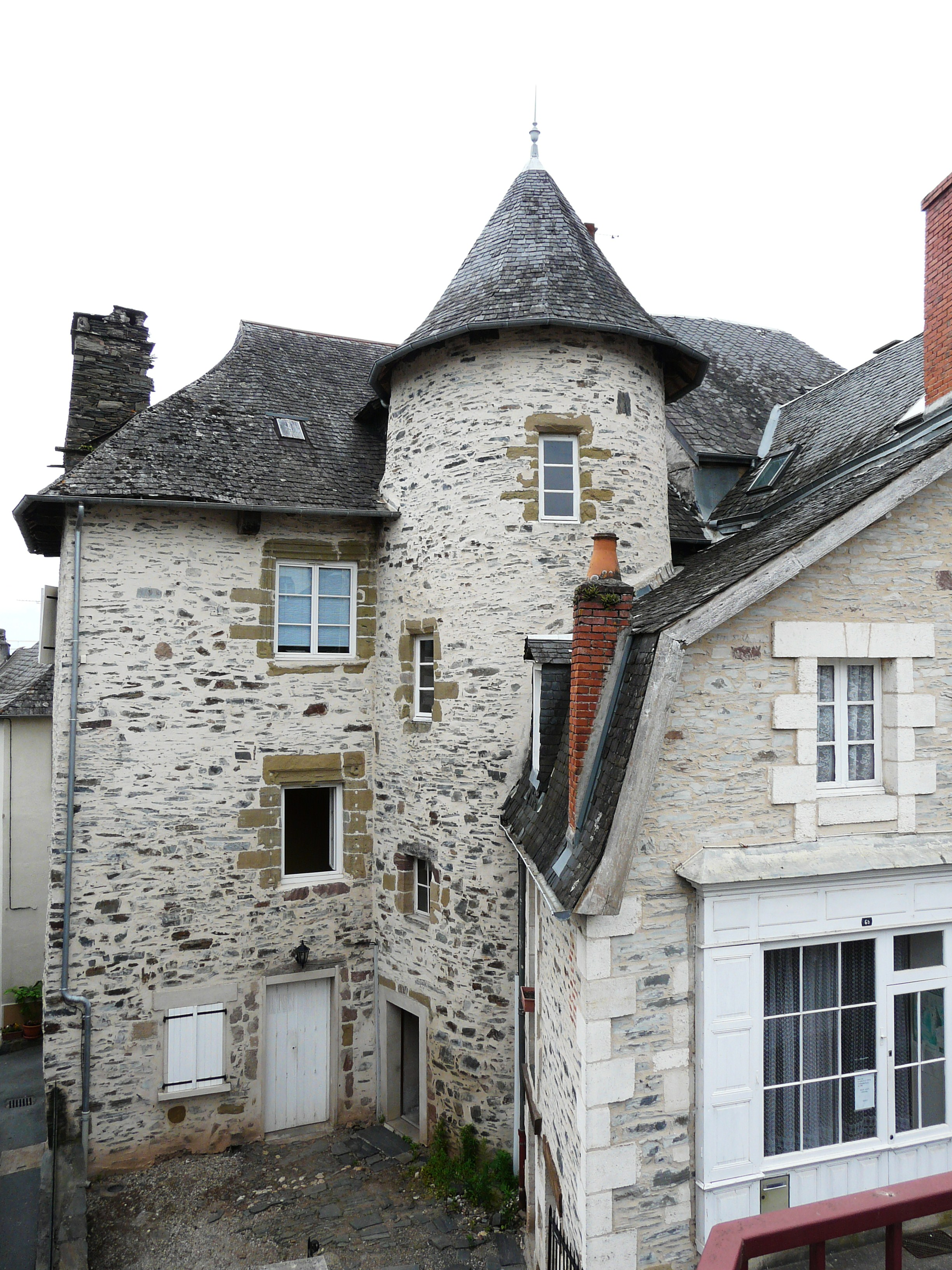
Old houses

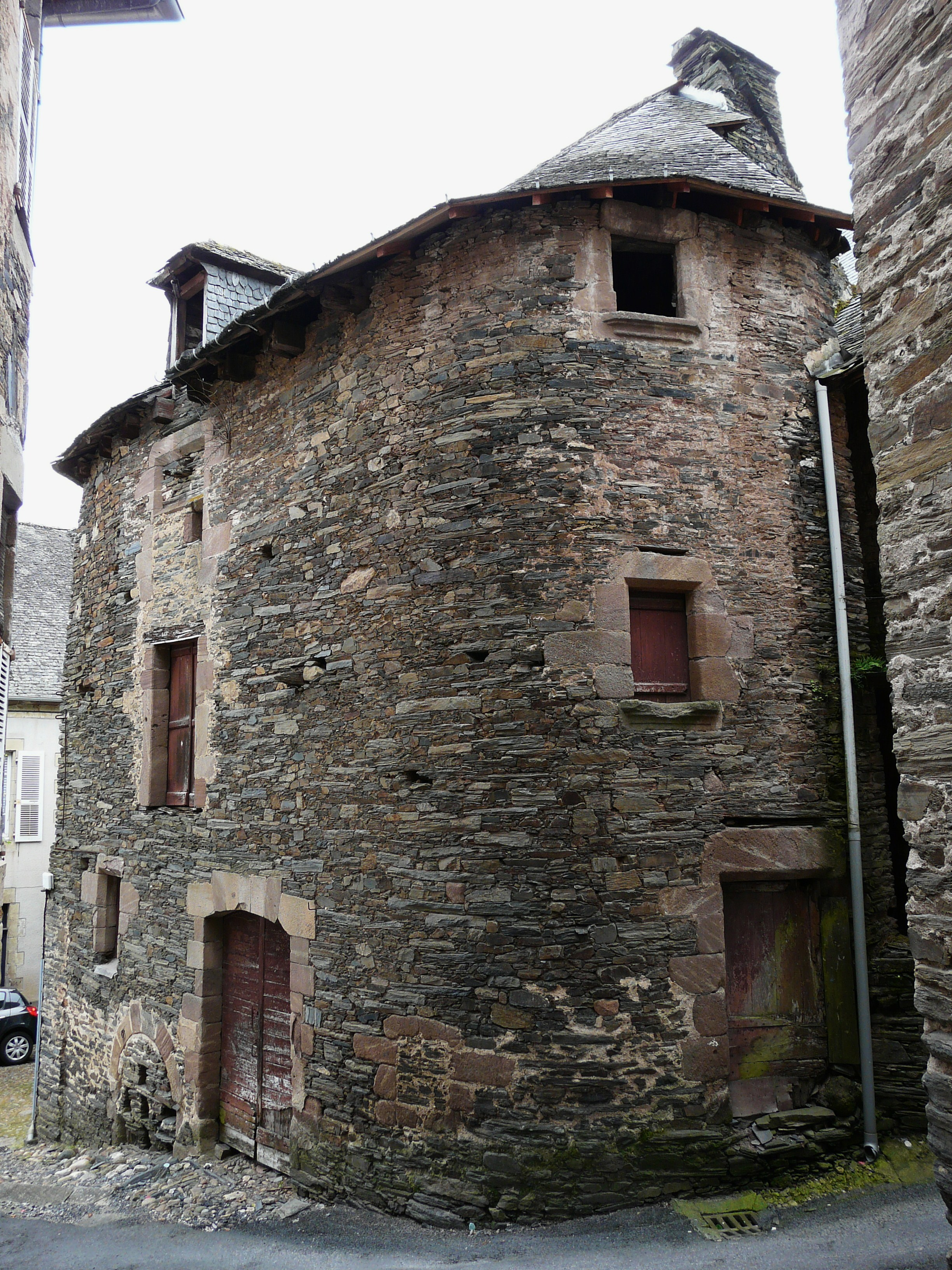
in the town

The site of La Roche was inhabited as early as the Mesolithic period as evidenced by the Racloirs and Stone tools found in the area.

When it was occupied by the Romans Allassac already had several slate quarries that allowed rapid development of the town.

In 572 Saint Yrieix and his mother donated a farm and forges to Allassac which was part of Yssandon Country. In the Carolingian period there was already a fortified complex with a church and a house belonging to the abbots of Limoges as well as a stately home.

In 864 the relics of the Holy Innocents were transported to Allassac to protect them from Norman invaders.

In the Middle Ages Allassac became a lordship of the Abbey of Saint-Martial of Limoges. This was a co-lordship belonging among others to the Roffignac family who were called the "first Christians of Limousin".

In the 14th century the town had a second enclosure with 17 towers, 8 gates, and 6 castles. The Bishopric fought to protect its territory.

In the 16th and 17th centuries Allassac expanded due to the activities in the slate quarries and food curing despite several sieges. In 1569, Henry d'Anjou spent a few days in the commune with his armies. In 1580 Allassac was the fourth largest city in Lower Limousin (today's Corrèze current). The number of fortified noble houses was increasing.

In 1790, Allassac was briefly the capital of the canton before giving way to Donzenac in 1801.

In 1870 the population was 4,200 inhabitants and for over a century slate mining remained an important industry. The farmers were also slate miners but phylloxera ended this dual economy. The farmers then turned to fruit and tobacco cultivation while developing slate quarries with the new opportunity to ship to Paris by train.

=== Heraldry ===
Arms of Aillassac	Arms adopted in 1981 by the City Council representing: on the left, the family crest of Lasteyrie of Saillant and on the right the family of Roffignac . Blazon: Party per pale first party per fesse: 1 sable with an eagle of Or displayed, 2 argent charged with a Label of 3 points in gules; second of Or with a lion in gules.

== Administration ==
List of Successive Mayors

Mayors from the French Revolution to 1941

From	To	Name
1790	1791	Léonard Bonneylie
1791	1791	Jean Lascaux
1791	1792	Pierre Treuil
1793	1794	Jean Lascaux
1795	1795	M. Vervi
1795	1795	Jean Lascaux
1796	1797	Pierre Deyzac
1797	1797	Jean-Baptiste Bonneylie
1797	1800	Pierre Lascaux
1800	1812	Jean-Baptiste Bonneylie
1812	1826	Jean-Baptiste Alègre
1826	1830	Charles de Foucald
1830	1831	M. Lasteyrie
1831	1836	Bertrand-Cyprien Boche
1836	1870	Mathieu Alègre
1870	1874	Henri Bardon
1874	1875	Mathieu Alègre
1875	1876	Louis Lavialle
1876	1884	Henri Bardon
1884	1896	Robert de Lasteyrie
1896	1912	Antoine Bourdu
1912	1928	Auguste Bourdarias
1928	1936	Albert Malfant
1936	1941	Ferdinand Marcou

Mayors from 1941

From	To	Name	Party	Position
1941	1944	Louis Boucharel		
1944	1944	Joseph Roncajoli		President of local liberation committee
1944	1953	Ferdinand Marcou		
1953	1977	Ernest Bounaix		
1977	1981	Jean Alliot	PS	Printer
1981	1983	Fernande Geneste		Retired
1983	1995	Michel Sancier		Carrier
1995	2014	Gilbert Fronty	PS	Schoolteacher, General Council member
2014	2026	Jean-Louis Lascaux	DVG	

== Population ==
The inhabitants of the commune are known as Allassacois or Allassacoises in French.

Historical population
Year	Pop.	±% p.a.
1968	3,448	—
1975	3,474	+0.11%
1982	3,532	+0.24%
1990	3,379	−0.55%
1999	3,366	−0.04%
2007	3,685	+1.14%
2012	3,858	+0.92%
2017	3,903	+0.23%
2023	4,081	+0.75%
Source: INSEE

== Economy ==
Fruit-growing is well-developed in the commune, especially the Limousin apple (AOP), the peach, the plum, and the kiwifruit.

A vineyard called Coteaux du Saillant - Vézère has been replanted on five hectares on schistose soil. Allassac was famous for its vineyards until the end of the 19th century through the Saillant wine cellar. The most common varietals are Chenin, Sauvignon gris, chardonnay, merlot, and cabernet franc.

The breeding of Limousin breed calves raised by their mothers is also a common activity.

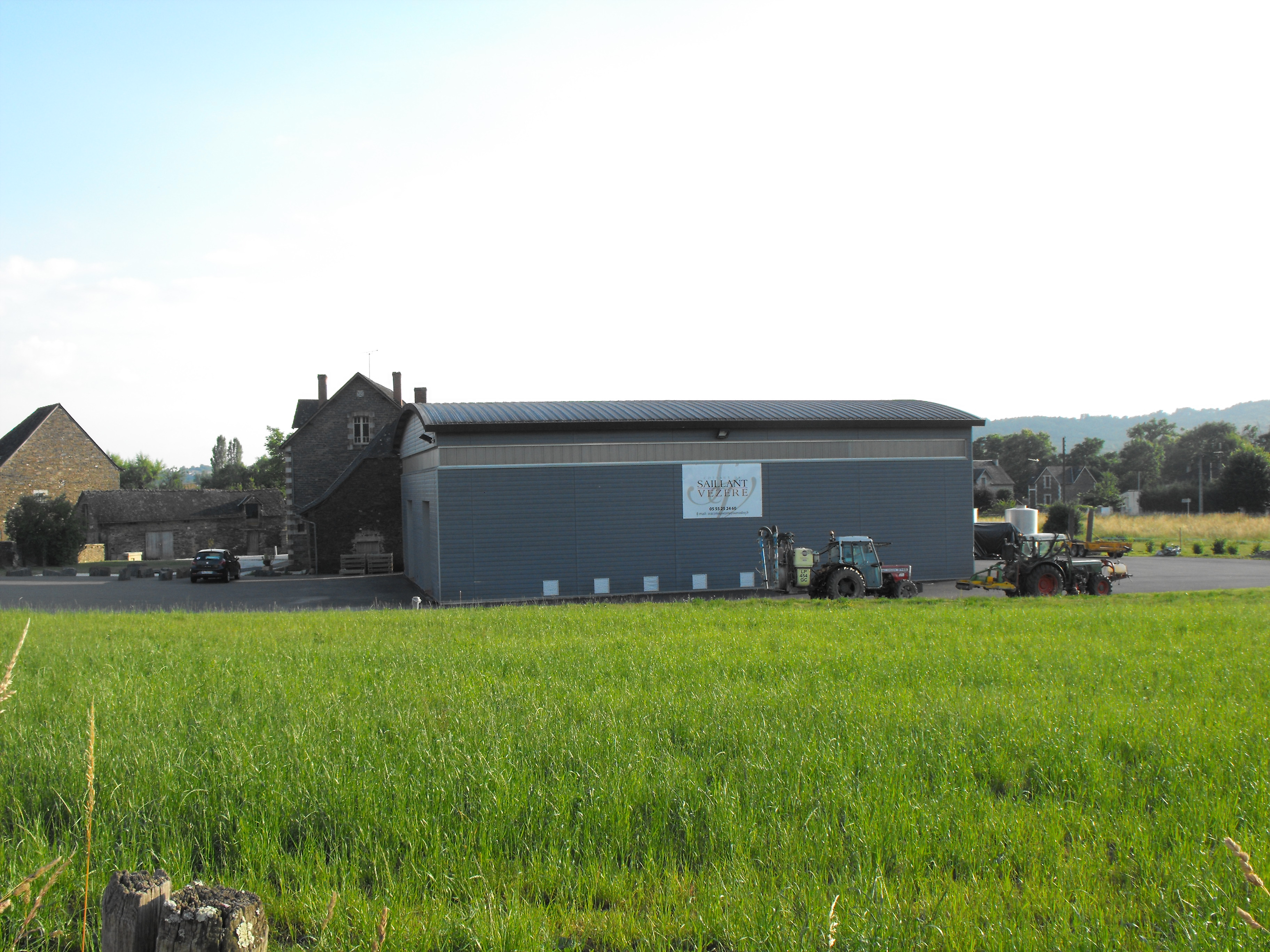
The Coteaux du Saillant-Vézère wine cellar at a place called La Jugie (Saillant d'Allassac)

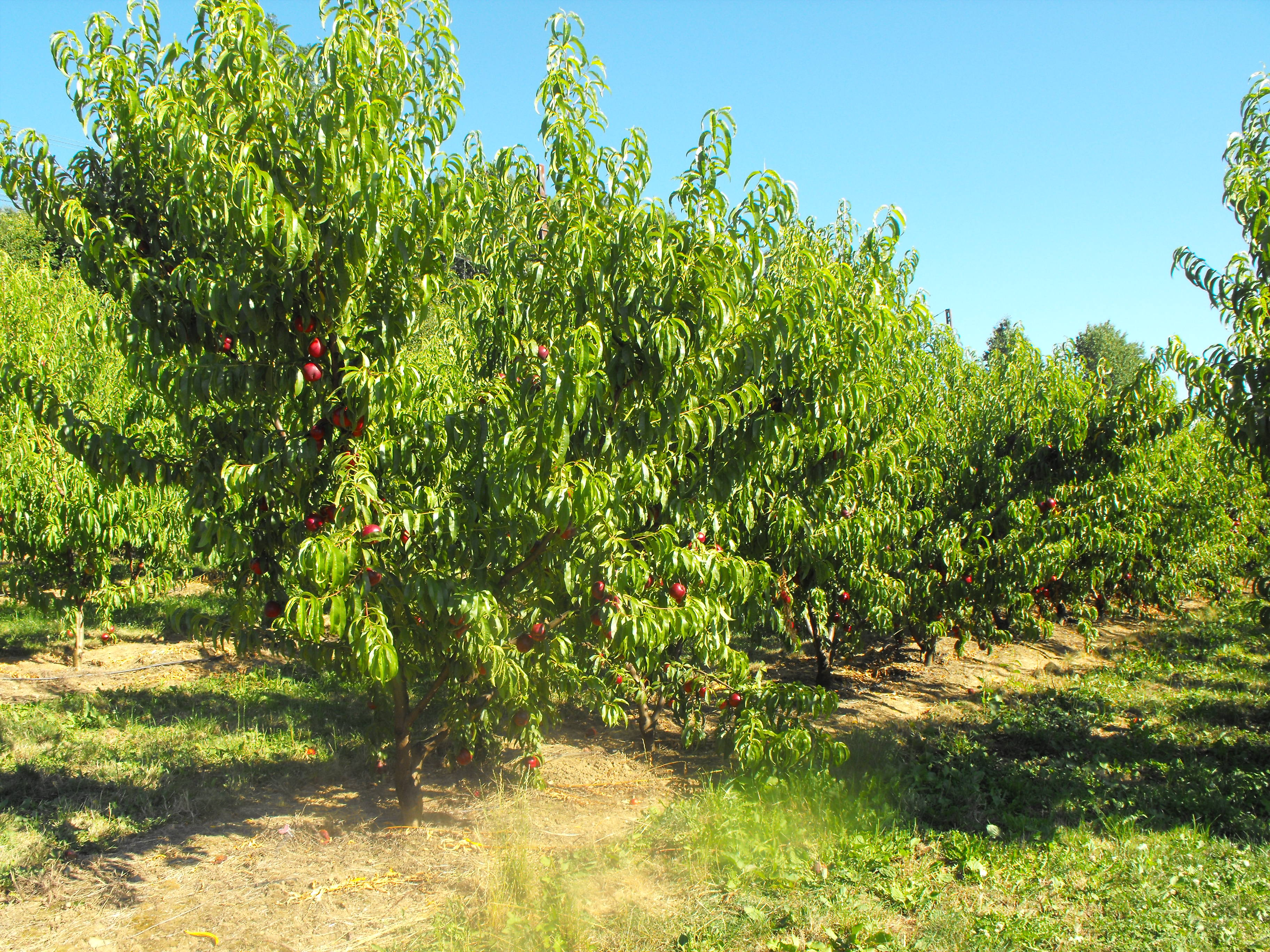
Growing of nectarines and peaches

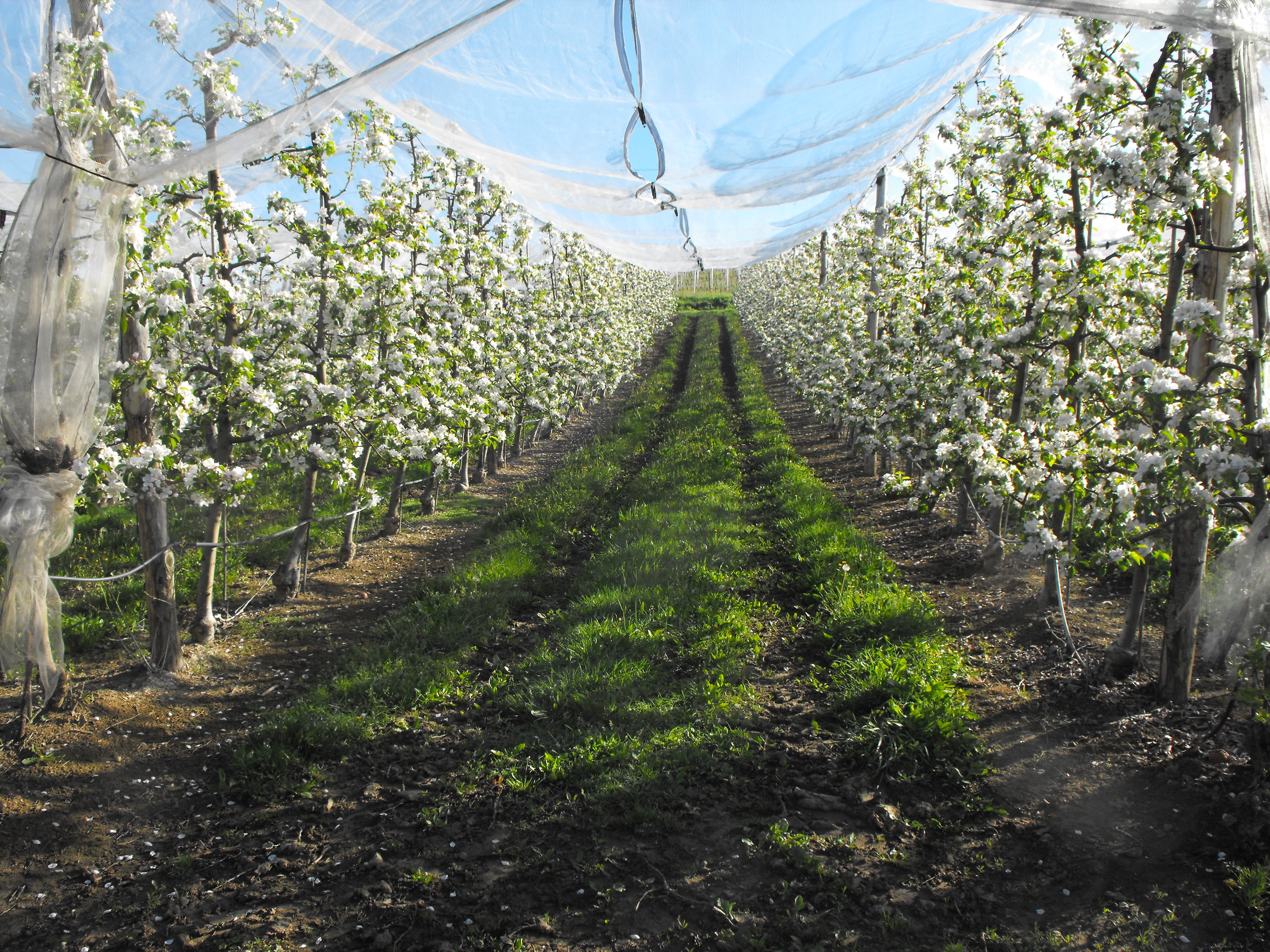
Apple Orchard

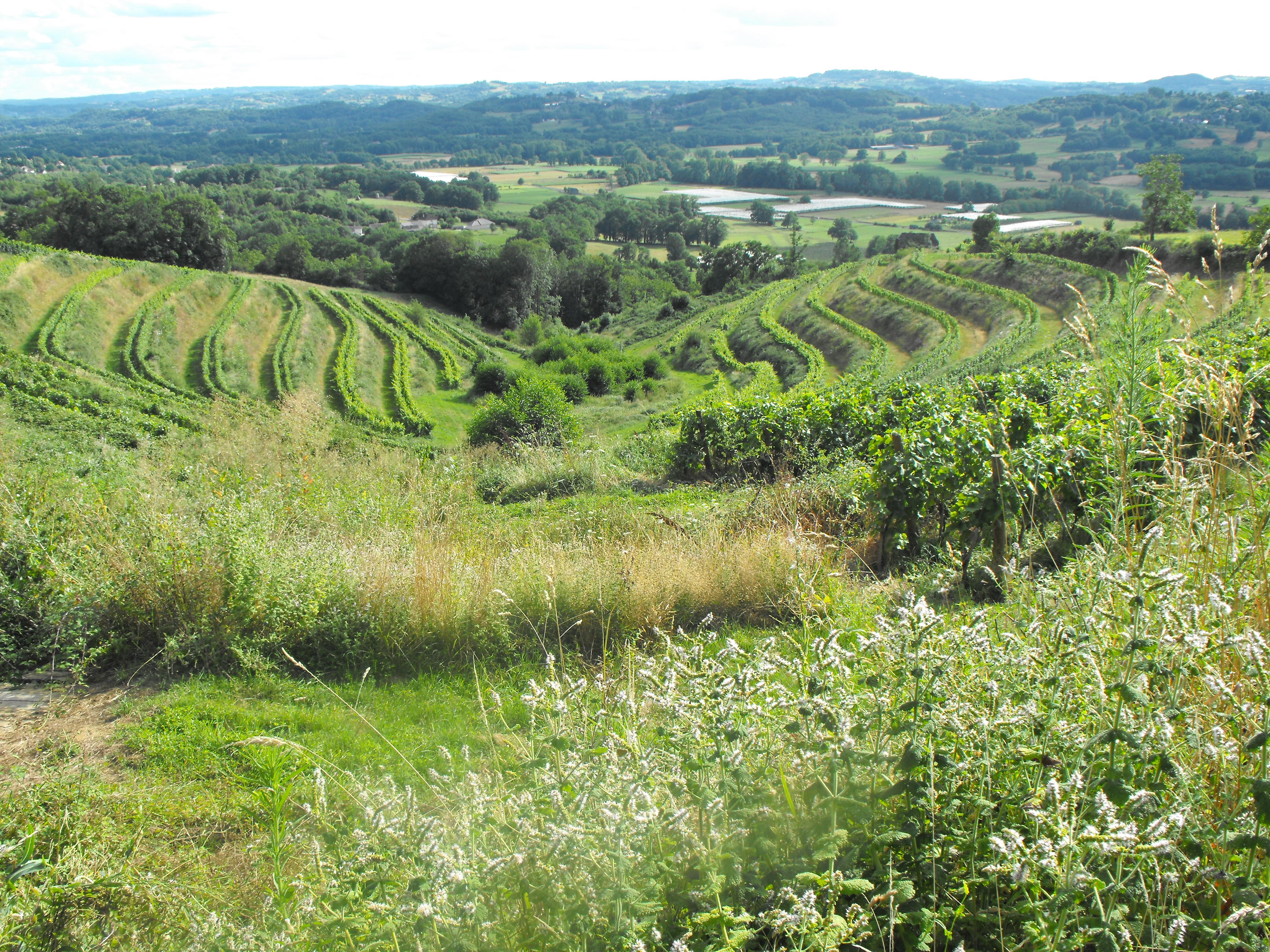
Coteaux du Saillant-Vezere near La Chartroulle

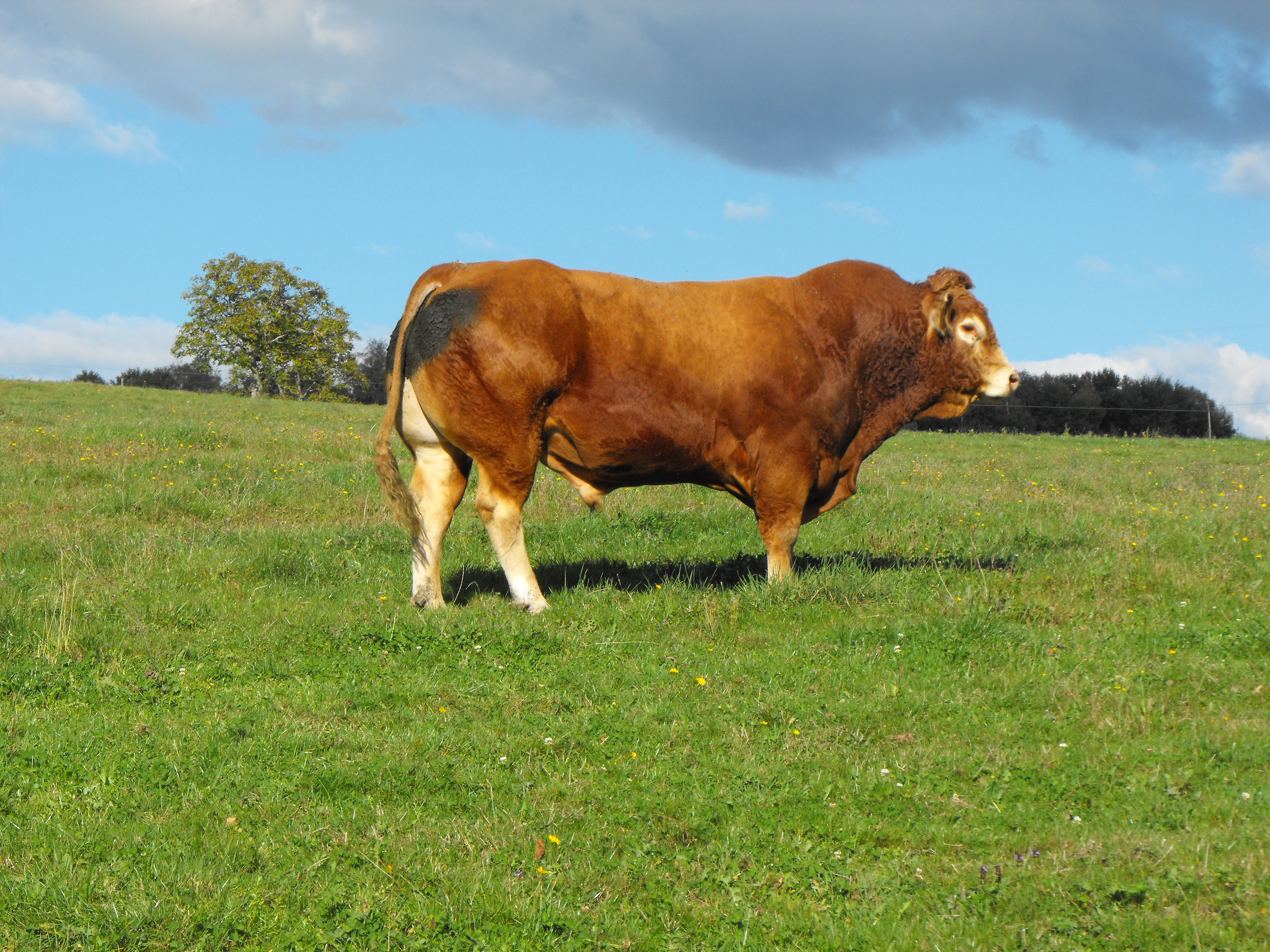
A Limousin bull

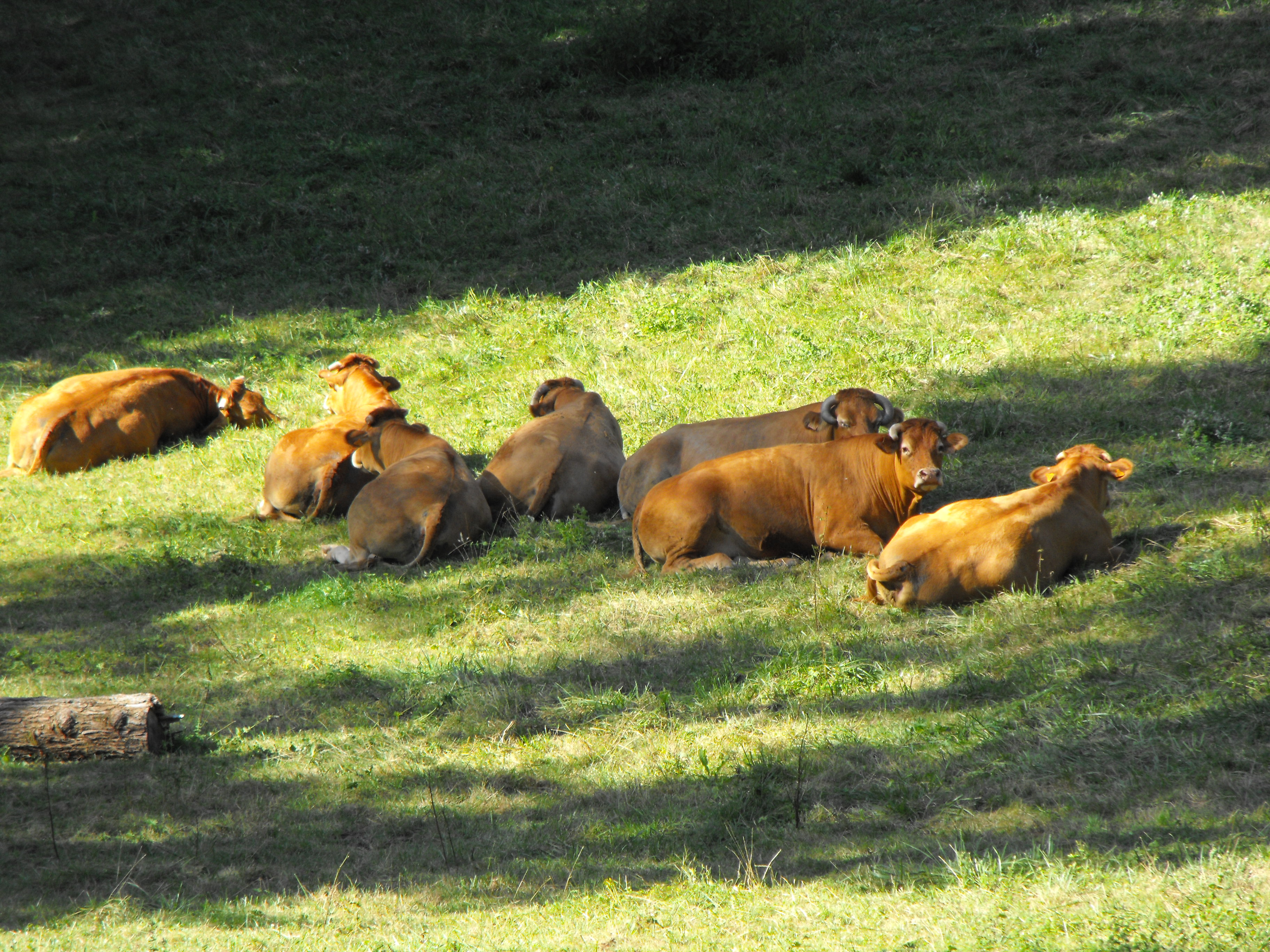
Limousin cows at rest

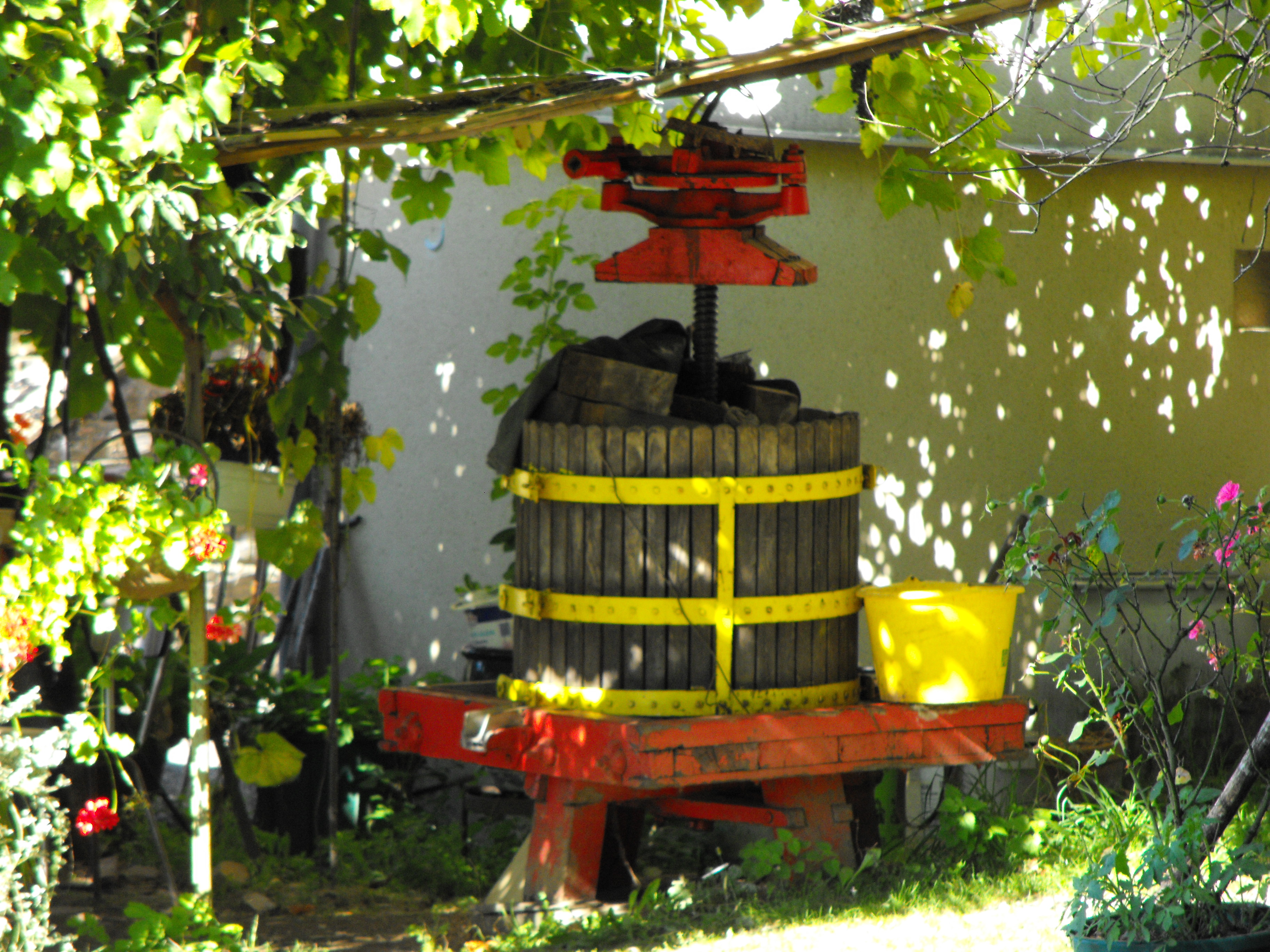
Old wine press

== Cinema ==
In 1962 a scene for the film Le Chevalier de Pardaillan by Bernard Borderie was filmed at Pont du Saillant.

== Sports ==
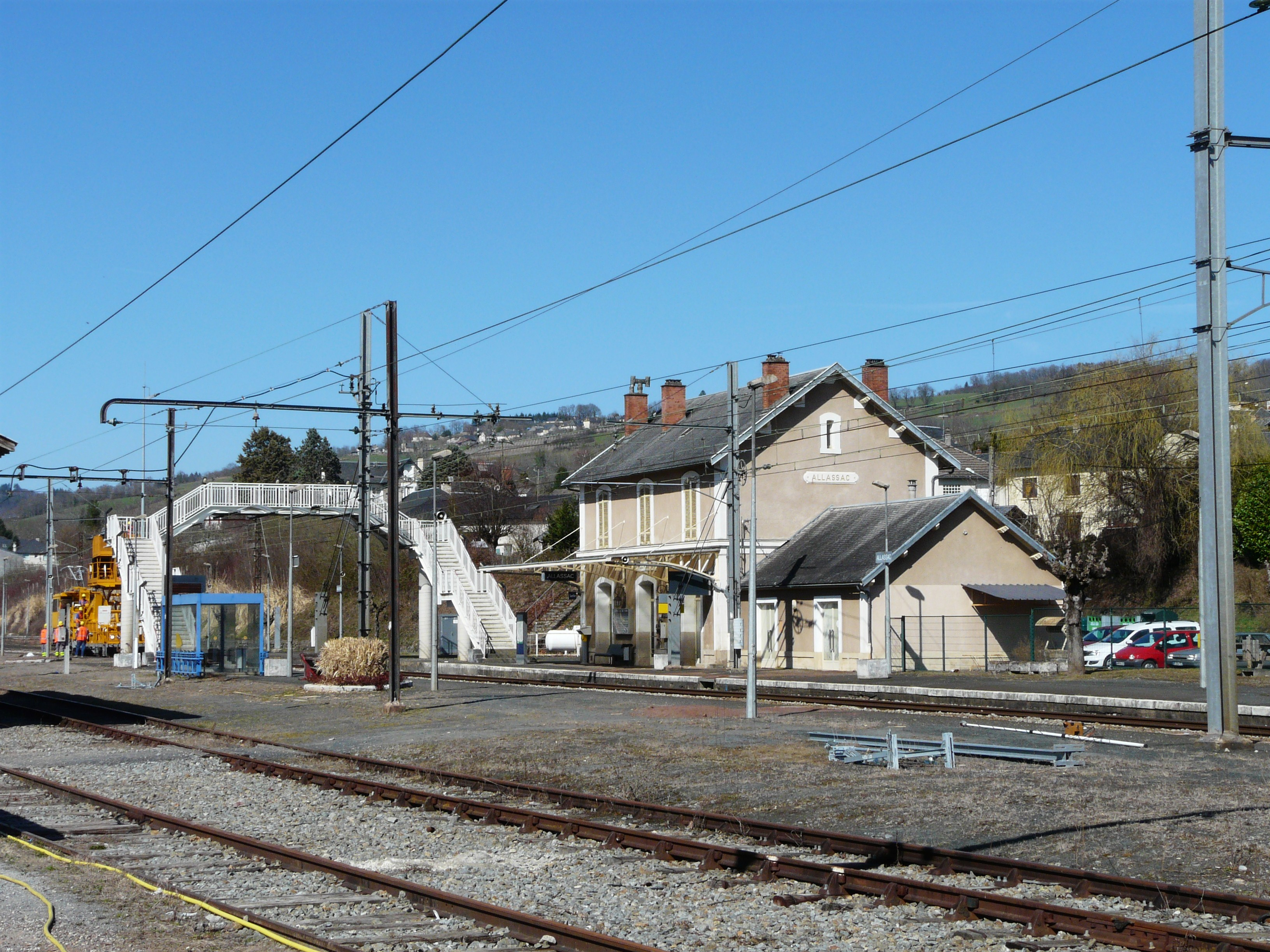
Allasac Railway Station

Volleyball: 3 teams are registered in the Union française des œuvres laïques d'éducation physique (UFOLEP) (mixed)

== Culture and heritage ==
=== Civil heritage ===
The commune has a number of buildings and structures that are registered as historical monuments:

- The Ecole des Tours Manor (15th century) houses a collection of 600 Roman and medieval weapons and armour as well as a forge for making weapons called "la Bombard" which was the last edge tool making activity in France
- The Tour de César (Caesar's Tower) (12th century) with a height of 30 metres is all that is left of the ancient fortifications. It is made of slate and gneiss. The battlements were added in the 15th century. This is one of the few round towers from the Middle Ages in Limousin.
- The old Saillant Bridge over the Vézère (16th century)

Other sites of interest

- The Chateau of Lasteyrie is a noble house from the 19th century at Saillant
- Le Saillant, a village traversed by the Vézère and shared between the communes of Allassac (The Saillant of Allassac left bank) and Voutezac (right bank).
- The Gorges and waterfalls of the Clan near the Three Villages
- The La Roche Site where Mesolithic rocks outcrop. It has an orientation table and offers a wide panorama of the Cirque du Saillant.
- At Garavet there is swimming and fishing in the Vézère

=== Religious heritage ===
- The Church of the Decapitation of Saint John the Baptist (12th century). is registered as an historical monument. The tower was fortified in the 14th century during the Hundred Years War. It has remarkable baroque furniture consisting of three altars and a pulpit. These were built by the Duhamel brothers around the year 1680. The central altarpiece (1679) is dedicated to the "sacred Heart of Jesus". That it depicts on one side Christ's Sacred Heart makes it exceptional as that devotion was activated only four years before the creation of the altar after the appearance of Christ to Margaret Mary Alacoque in Paray-le-Monial in 1675. The Church contains many items that are registered as historical objects:
  - An Altar, Retable, and 3 Statues (17th century)
  - An Eagle Lectern (17th century)
  - The whole Main Altar assembly (1679)
  - A Painting: Christ on the Cross (1869)
  - 2 Statues: Saint John the Baptist and Saint Joseph (1679)
  - A Group Sculpture: Virgin of Pity (15th century)
  - A Pulpit (1681)
- The Chapel of Saint-Férréol is from the 17th or 18th century and is partly in the cemetery in the village of La Chartroulle. The chapel contains two items that are registered as historical objects:
  - A Statue: Saint Ferréol (17th century)
  - A Group Sculpture: Virgin of Pity (16th century)
- The Chapel of Saint-Laurent from the 13th and 18th centuries in the village of Saint-Laurent has a gate opening directly onto the cemetery. The chapel contains three items that are registered as historical objects:
  - A Statue: Saint Laurent (15th century)
  - A Statue: Crowned Virgin and child (17th century)
  - A Statue on base: Saint Laurent (17th century)
- The Chapel of Saint-Nicolas of Tolentine was built in 1894 in the village of Brochat. It contains three items that are registered as historical objects:
  - A Statue: Saint Nicolas of Tolentino (17th century)
  - A Statuette: Virgin and child (15th century)
  - A Group Sculpture: Virgin of Pity (1554)
- The Chapel of Saint-Roch from the 16th and 19th centuries in the village of Gauch contains two items that are registered as historical objects:
  - A Group Sculpture: Saint Roch speaks to the rich (17th century)
  - A Group Sculpture: Saint Roch speaks to the poor (17th century)
- The Chapel of Saint-Marguerite was built in red sandstone from the 13th to the 18th century at the village of La Chapelle. It contains a Statue on base: Crowned Virgin and child (17th century) which is registered as an historical object.

=== Picture Gallery ===
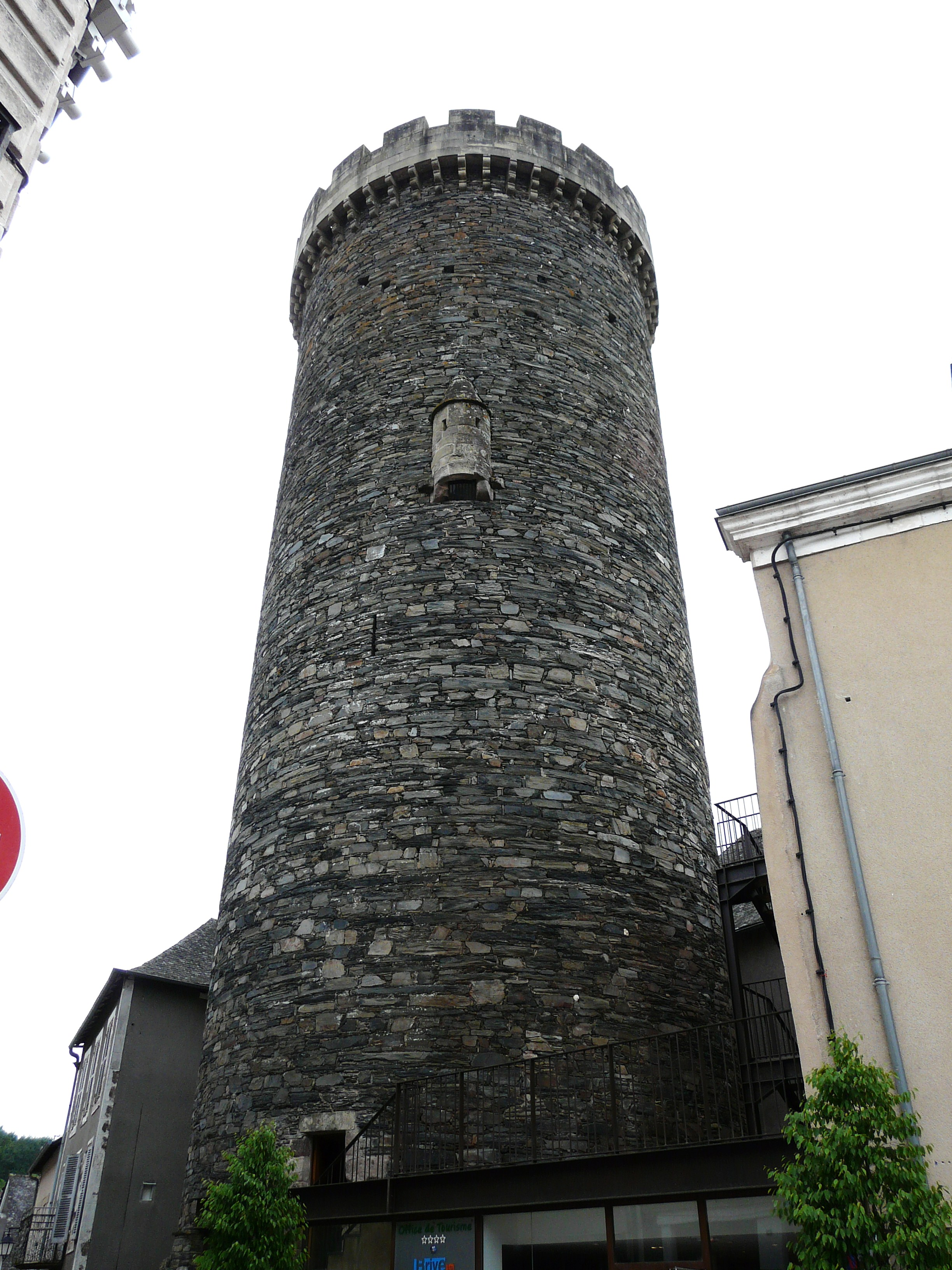
The César Tower

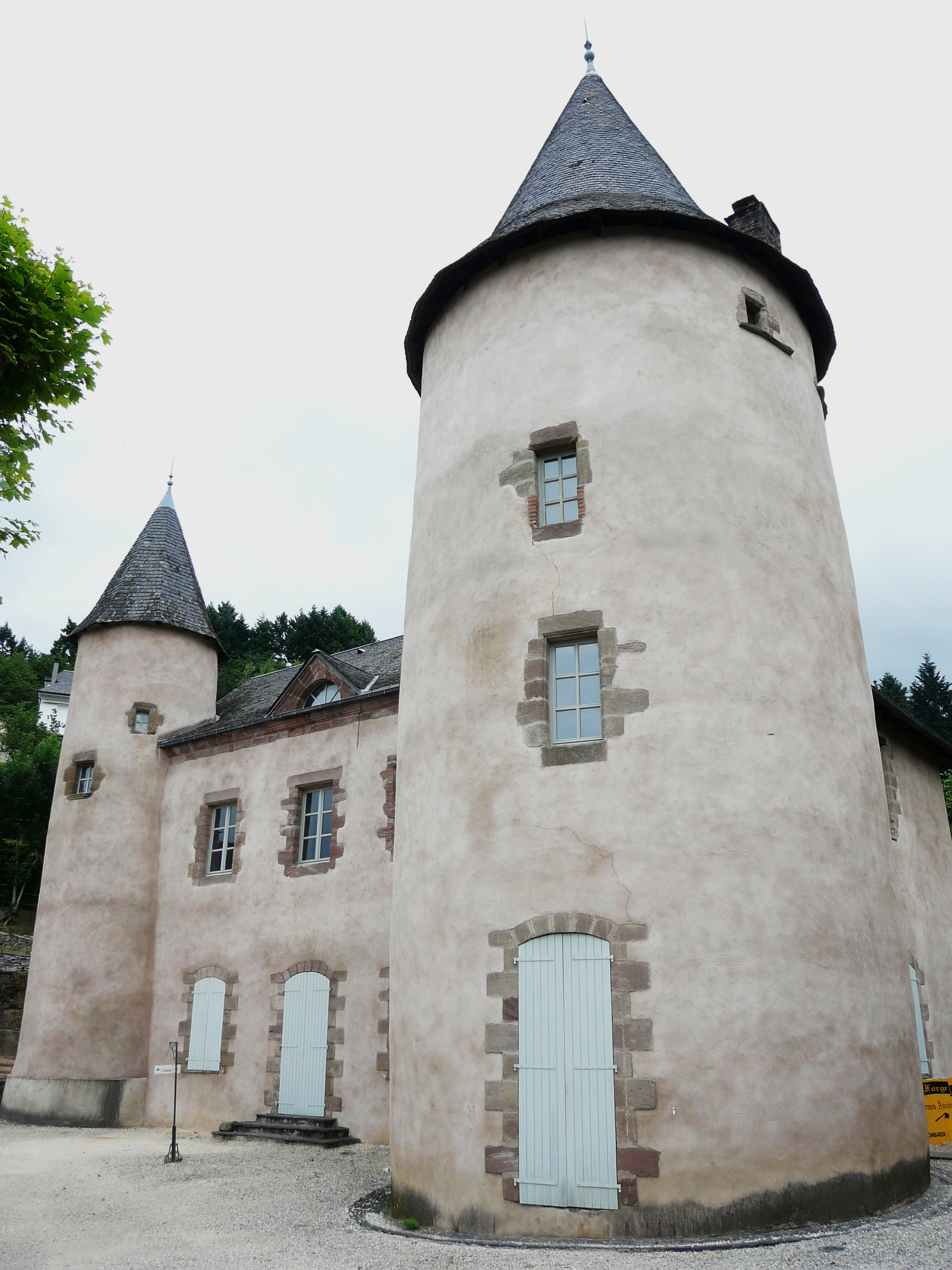
The Manor of Tours

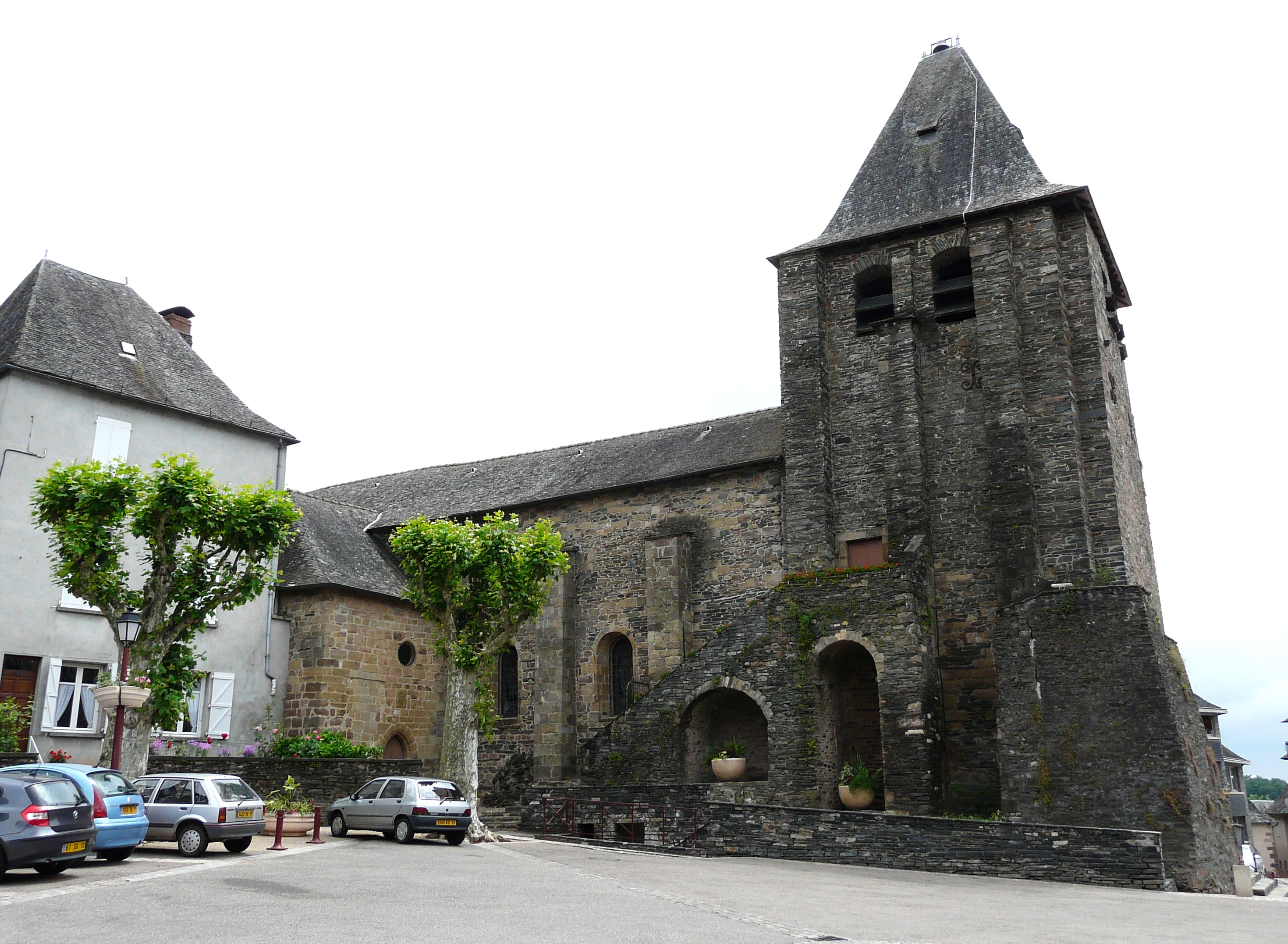
The Church of Saint John the Baptist

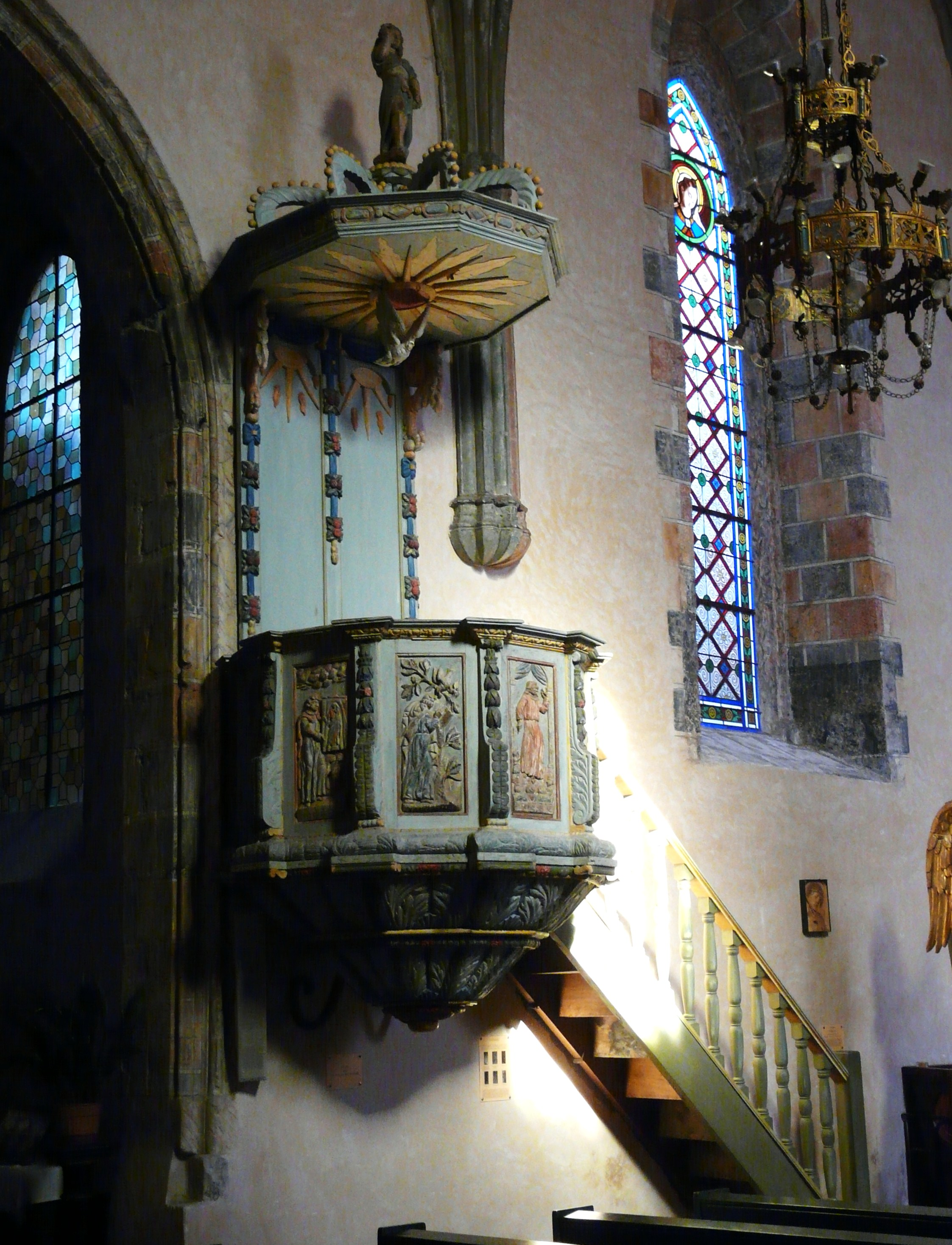
The choir of the church

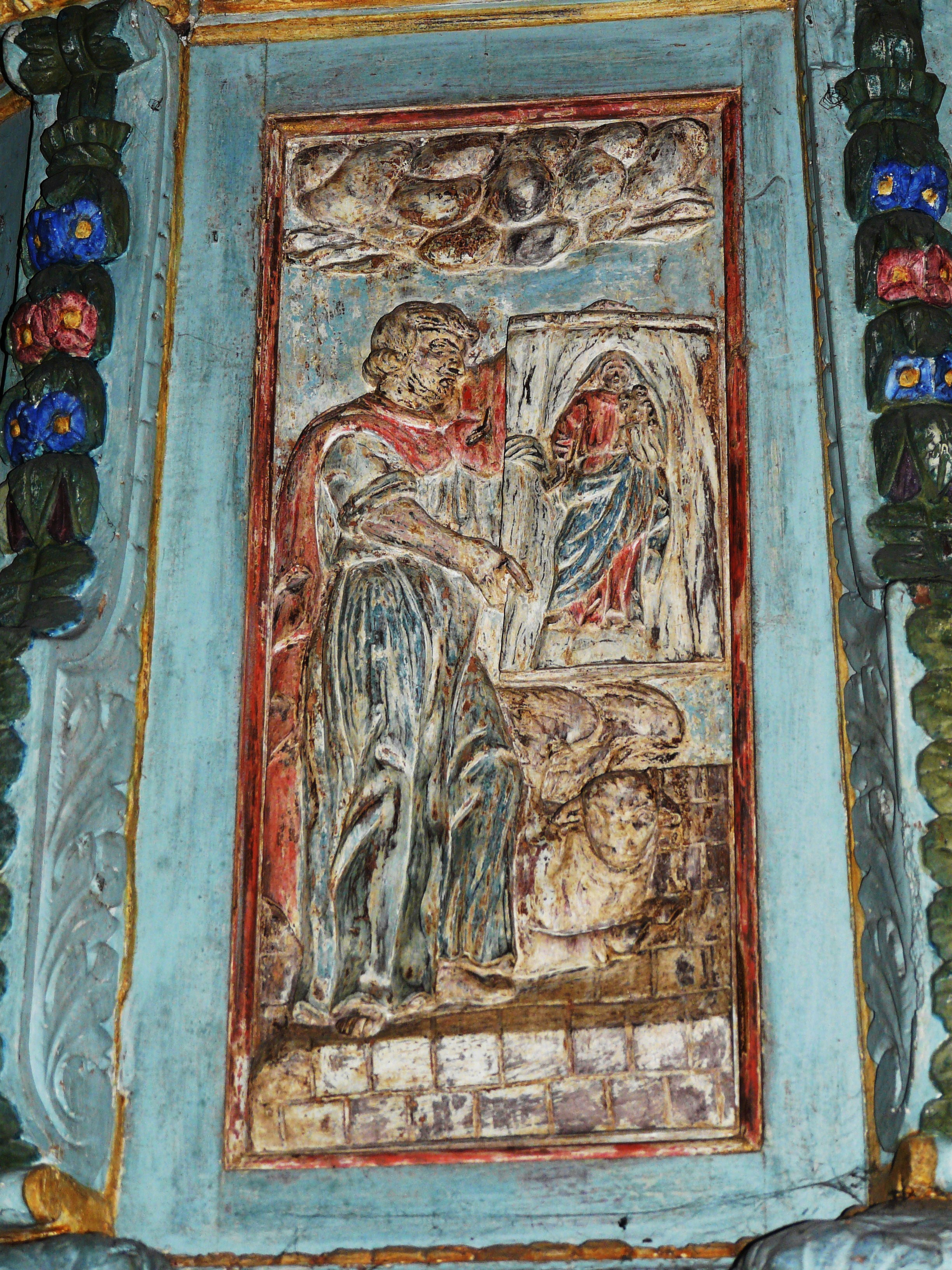
Detail of the choir:
Saint Luke with the bull
and the portrait of the Virgin

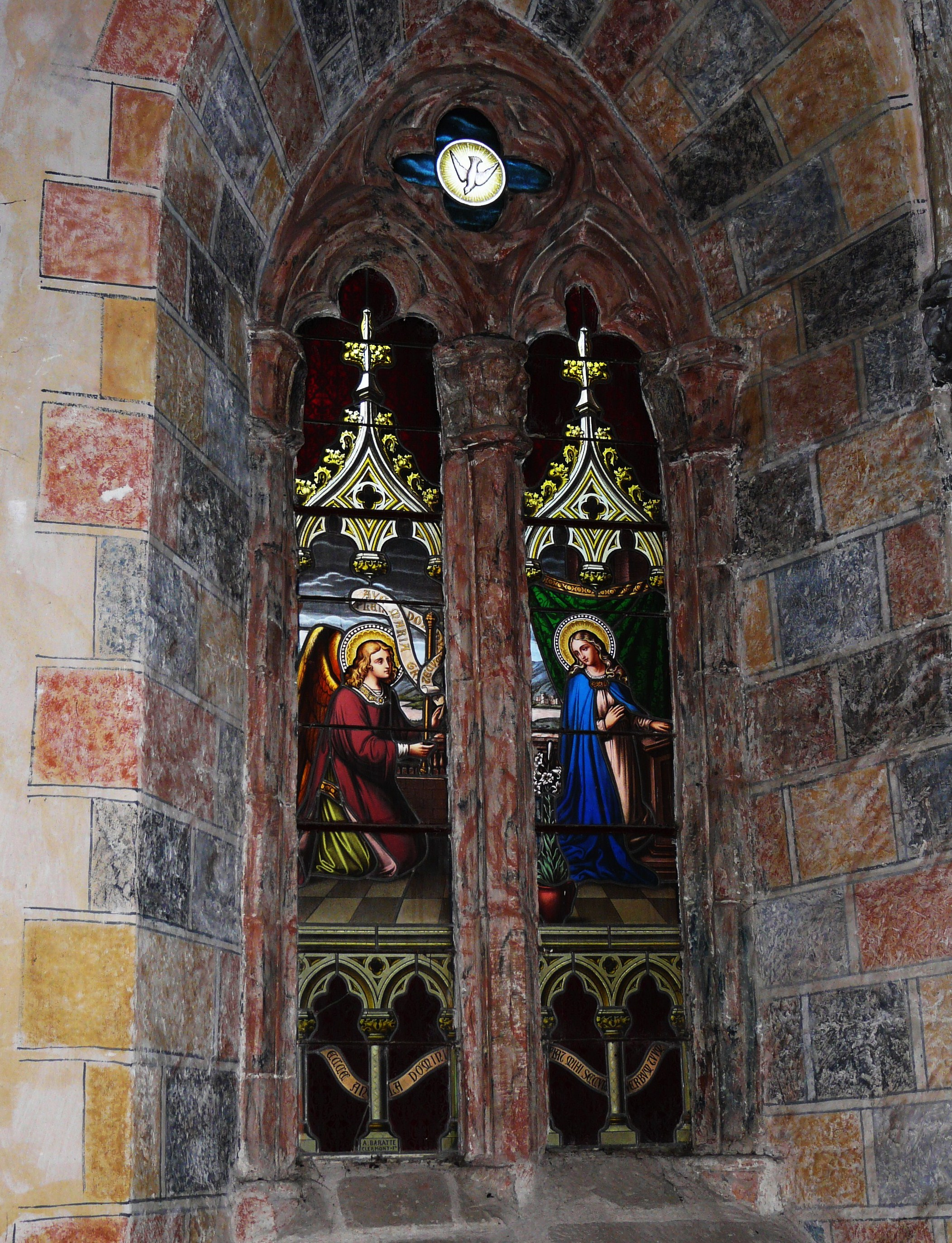
Stained Glass windows representing
The Annunciation to Mary

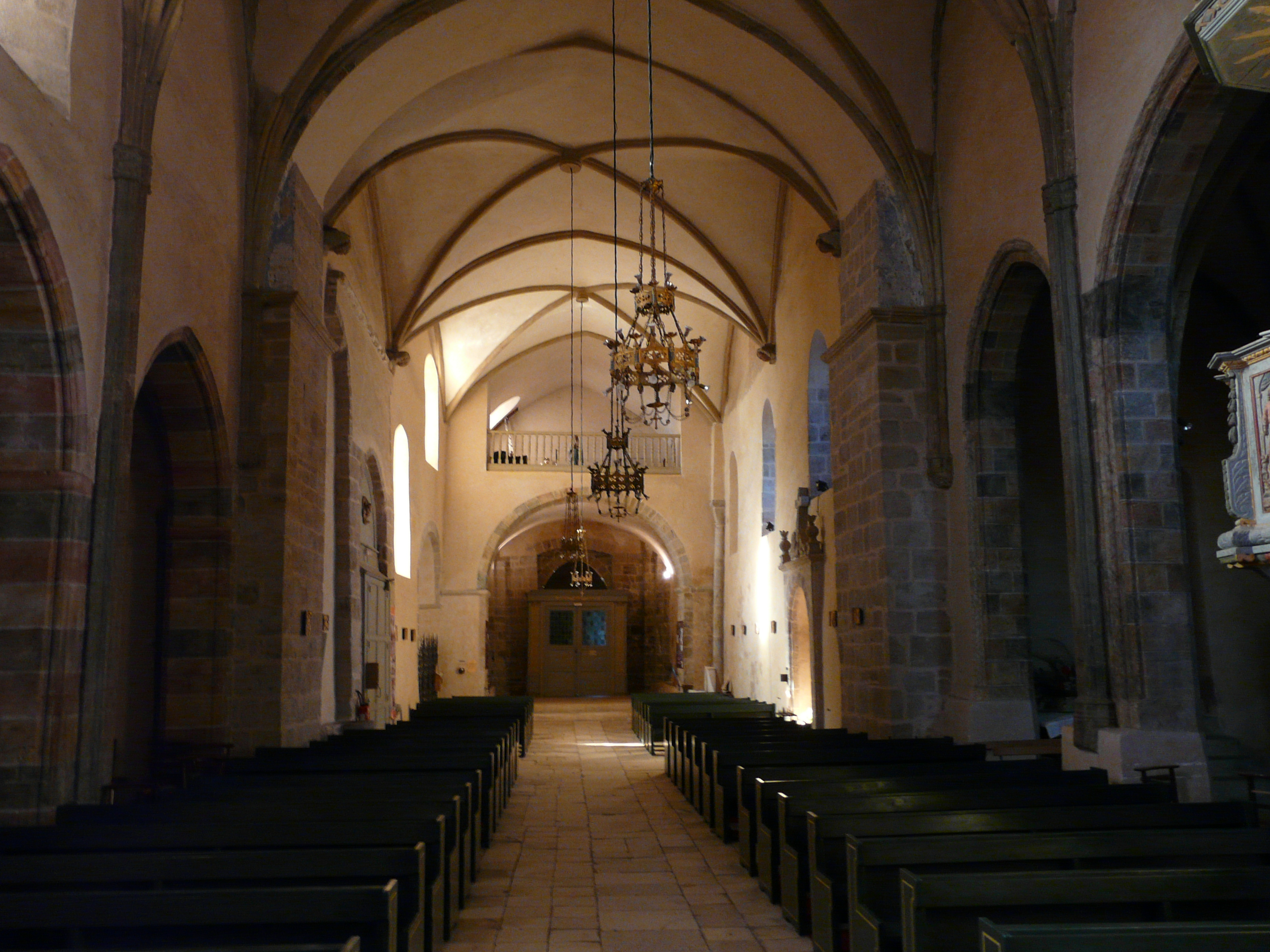
The nave of the church,
view towards the west portal

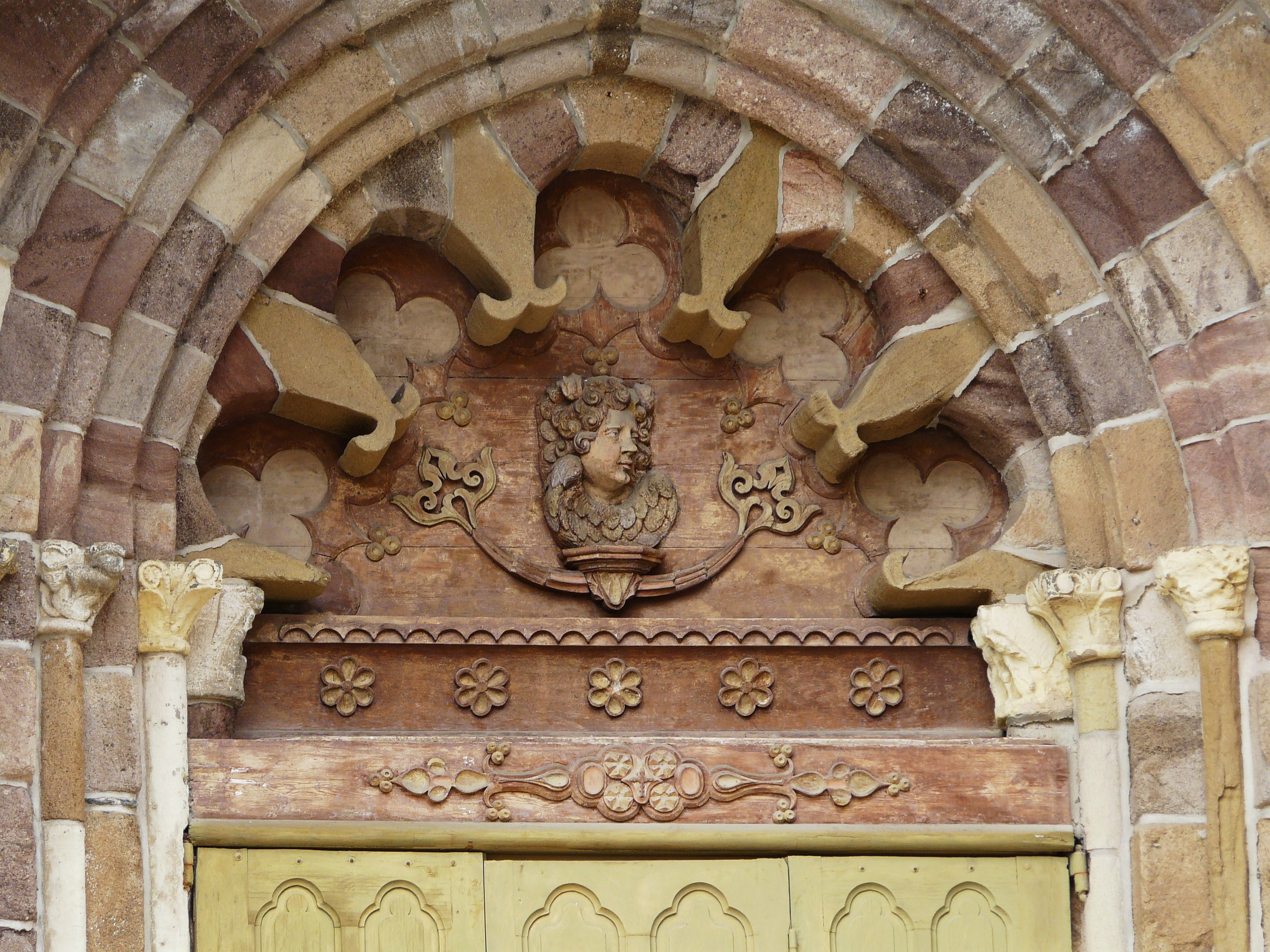
Detail of the south portal of the church

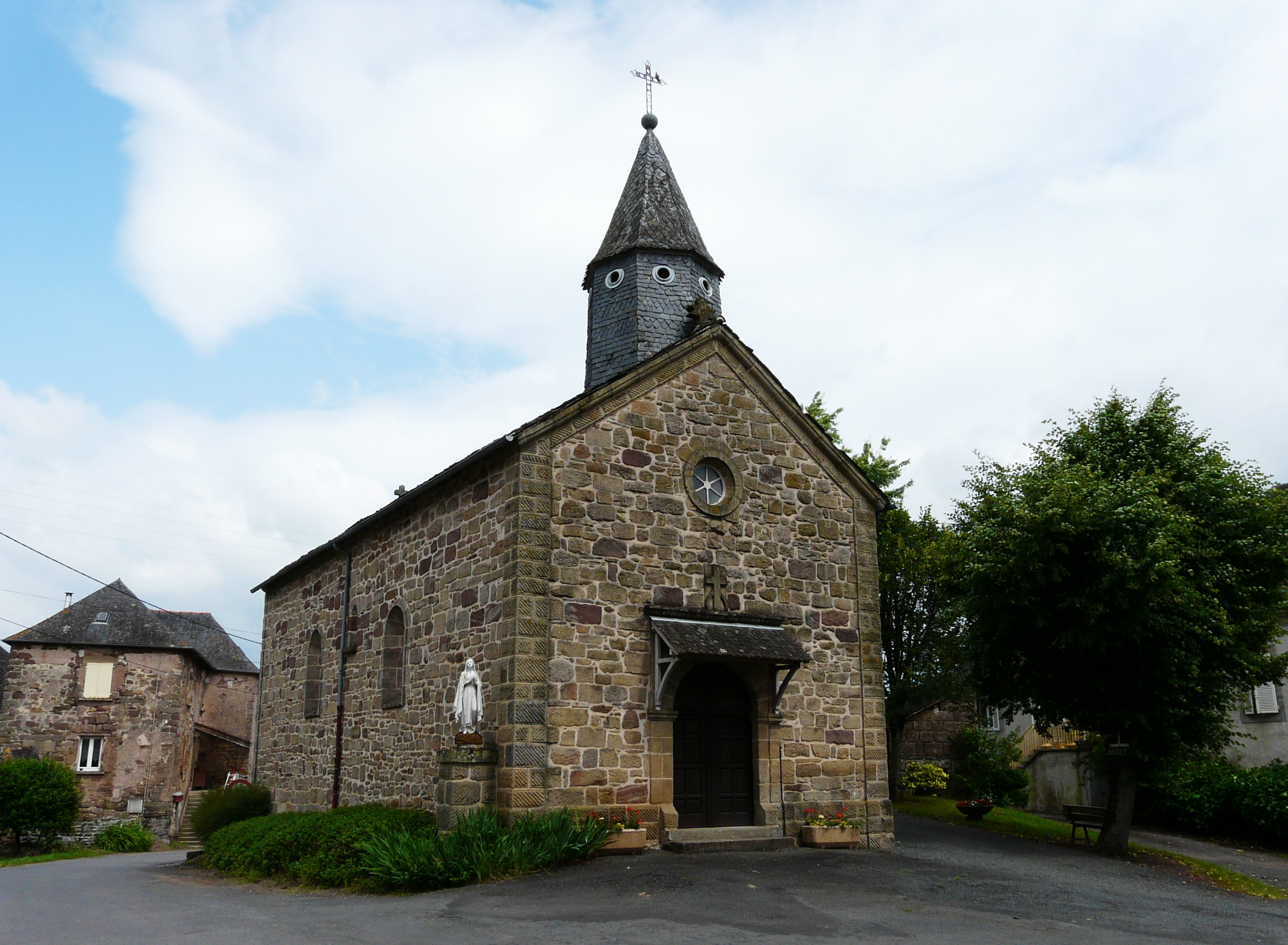
The Chapel of Saint-Nicolas of Tolentine

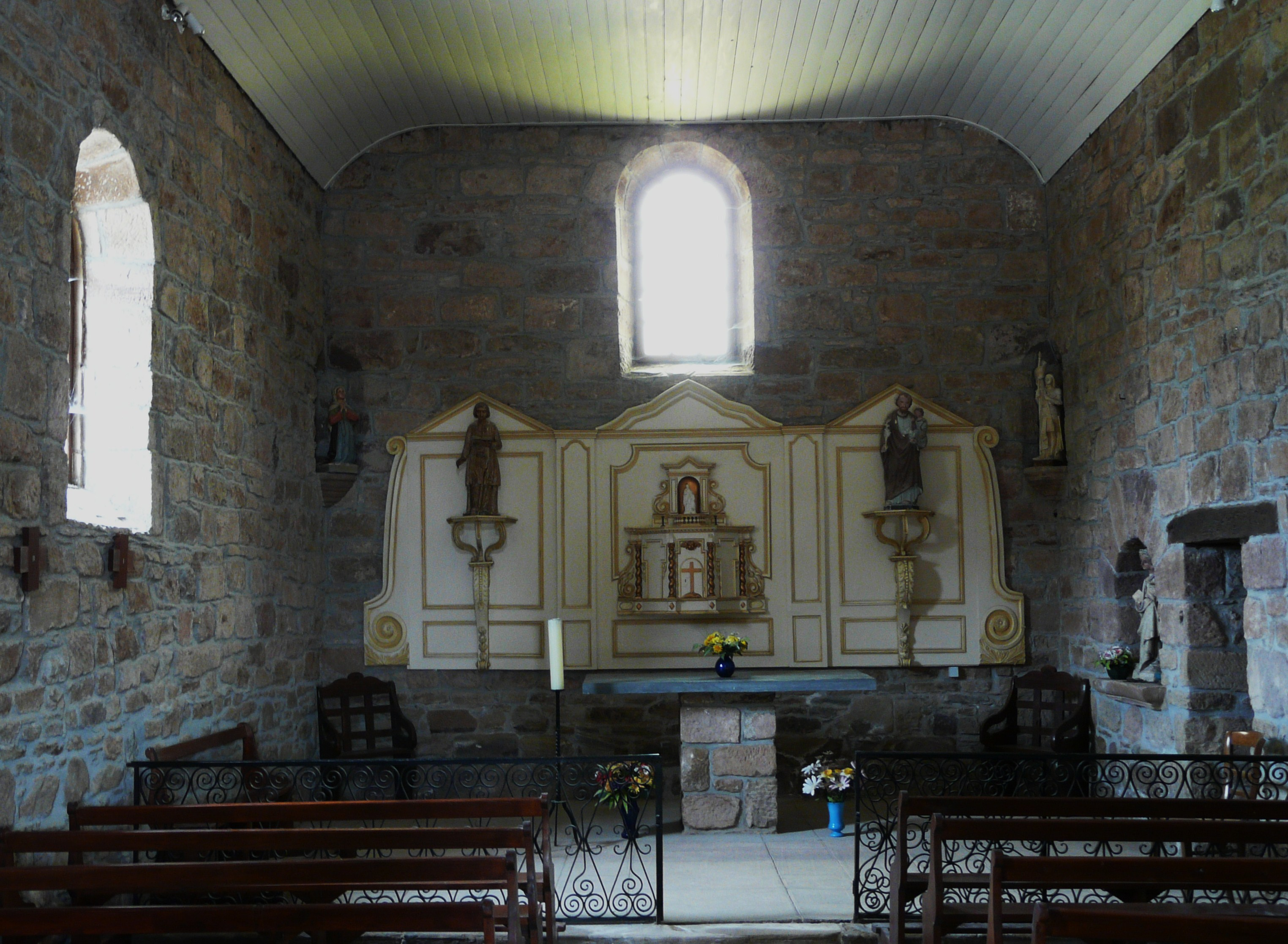
The interior of the chapel of Saint-Nicolas of Tolentine

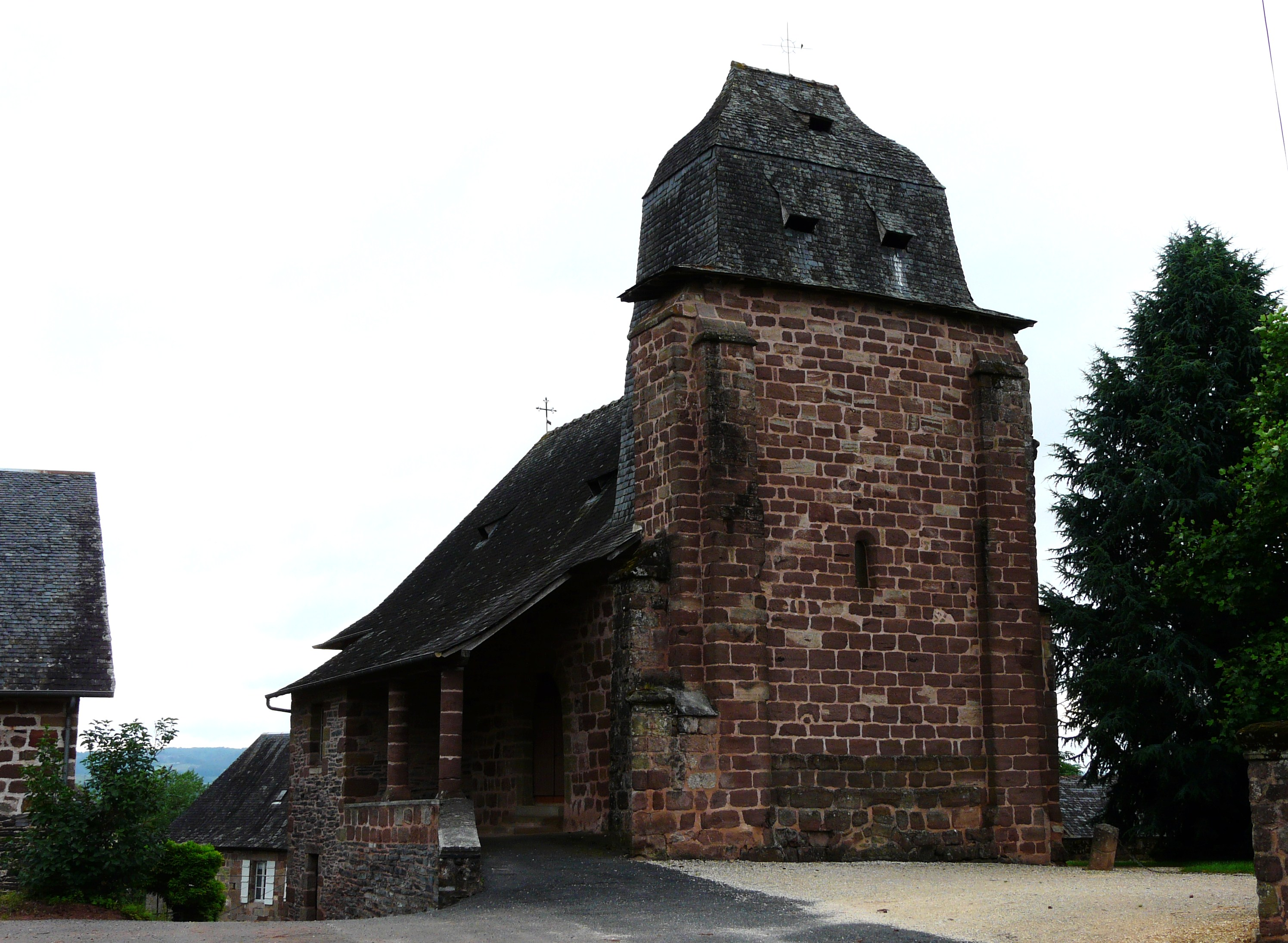
The Chapel Sainte-Marguerite

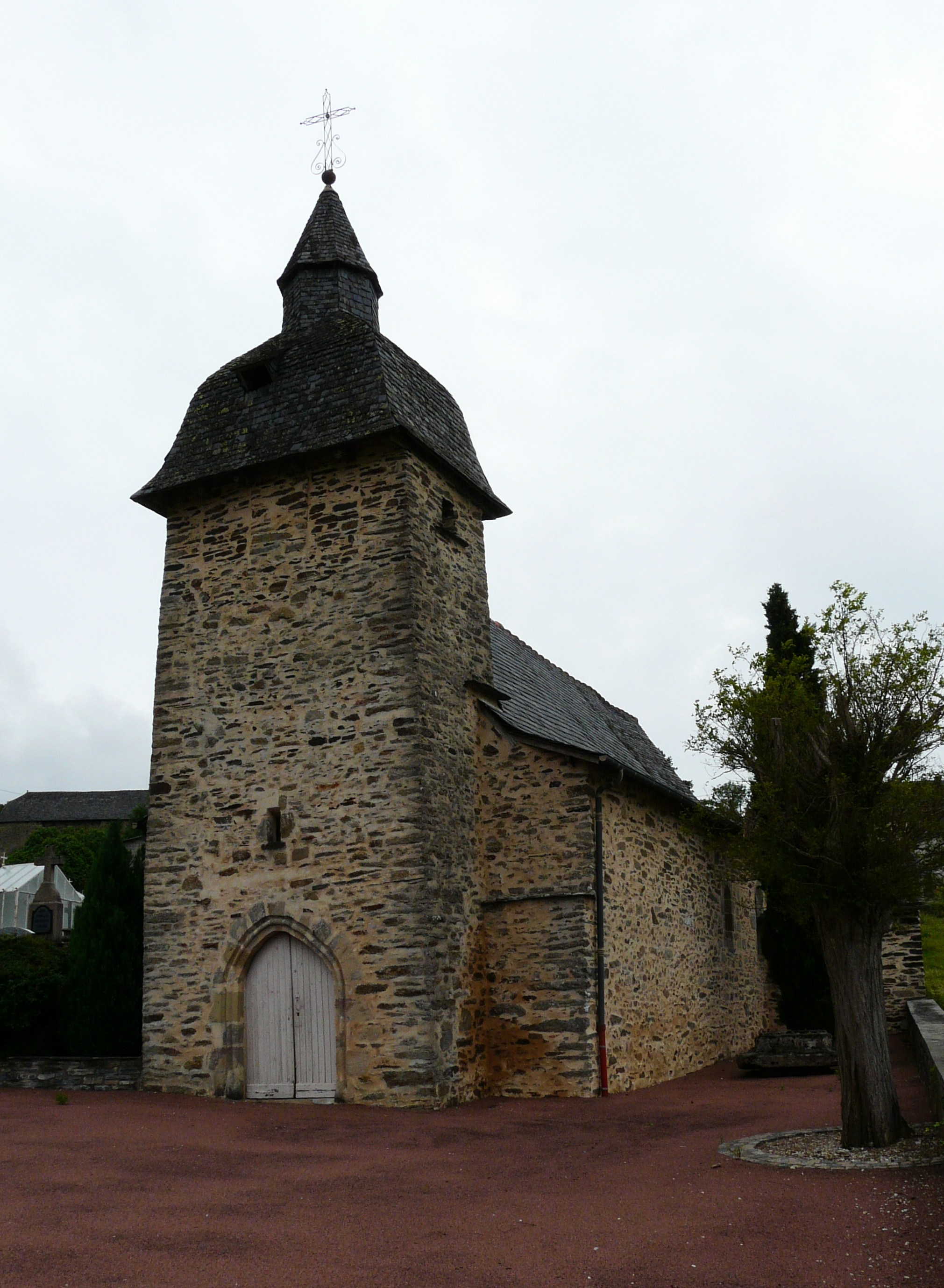
The Chapel of Saint-Ferréol

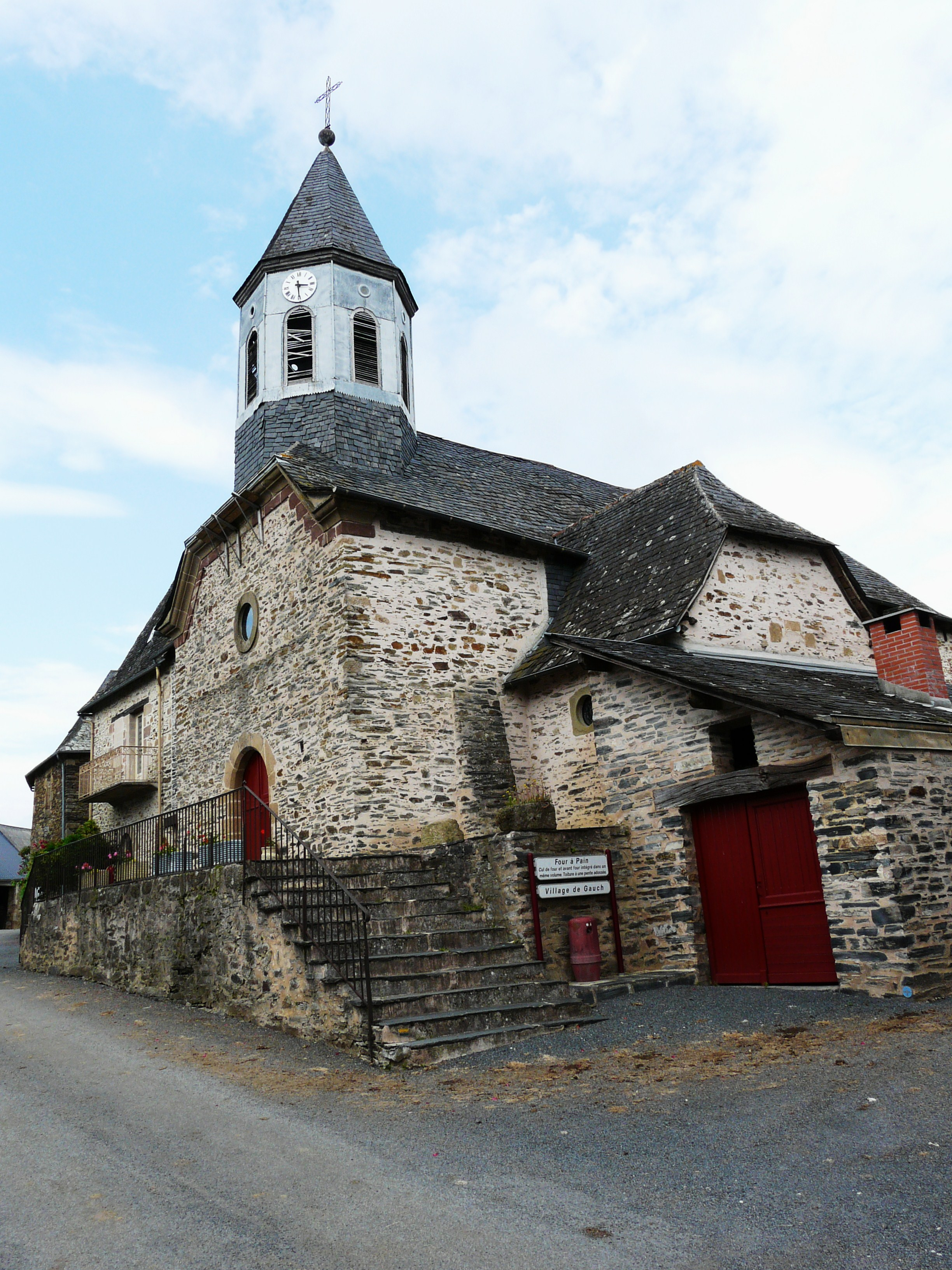
The Chapel Saint-Roch

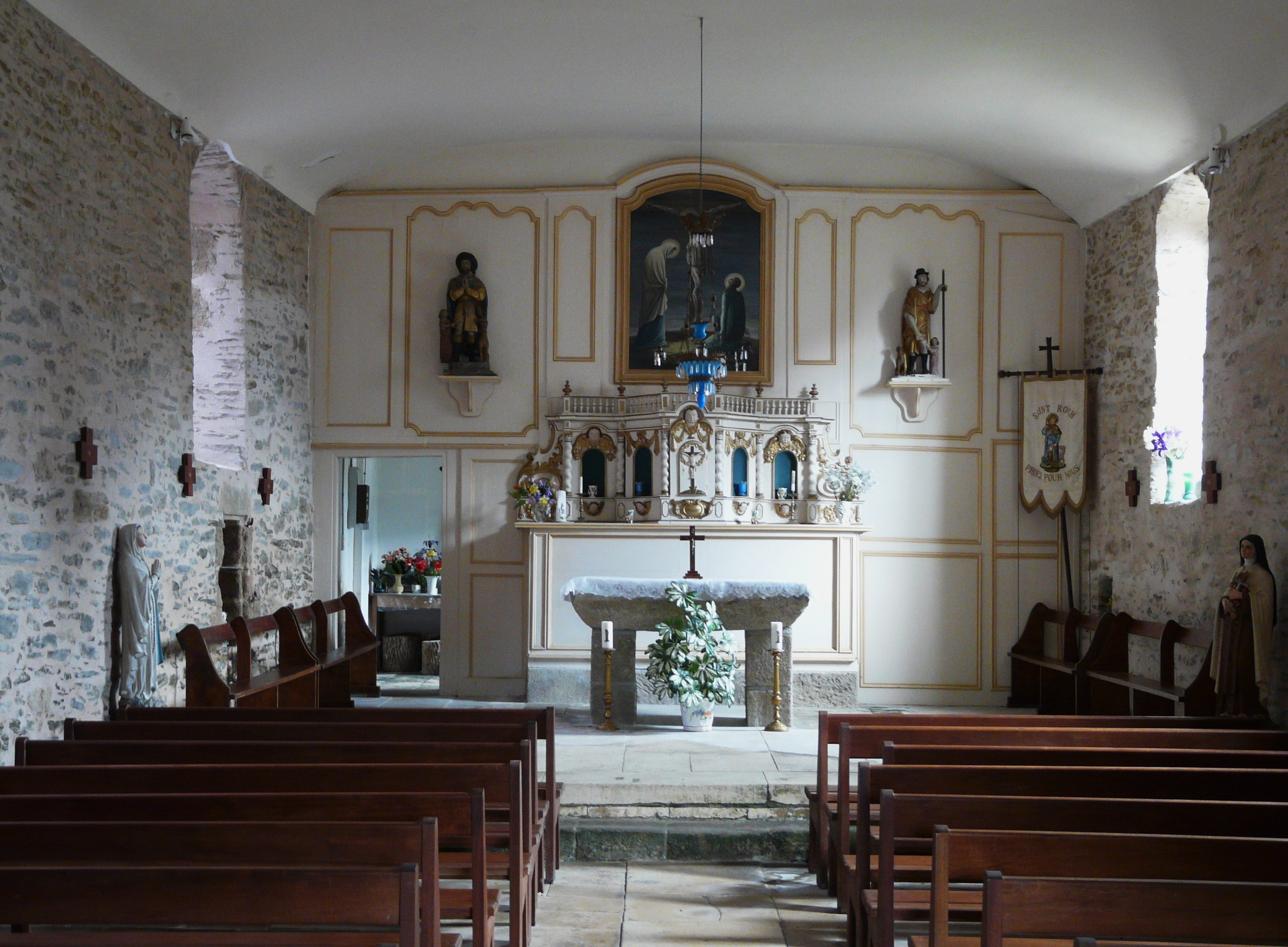
The interior of the Chapel Saint-Roch

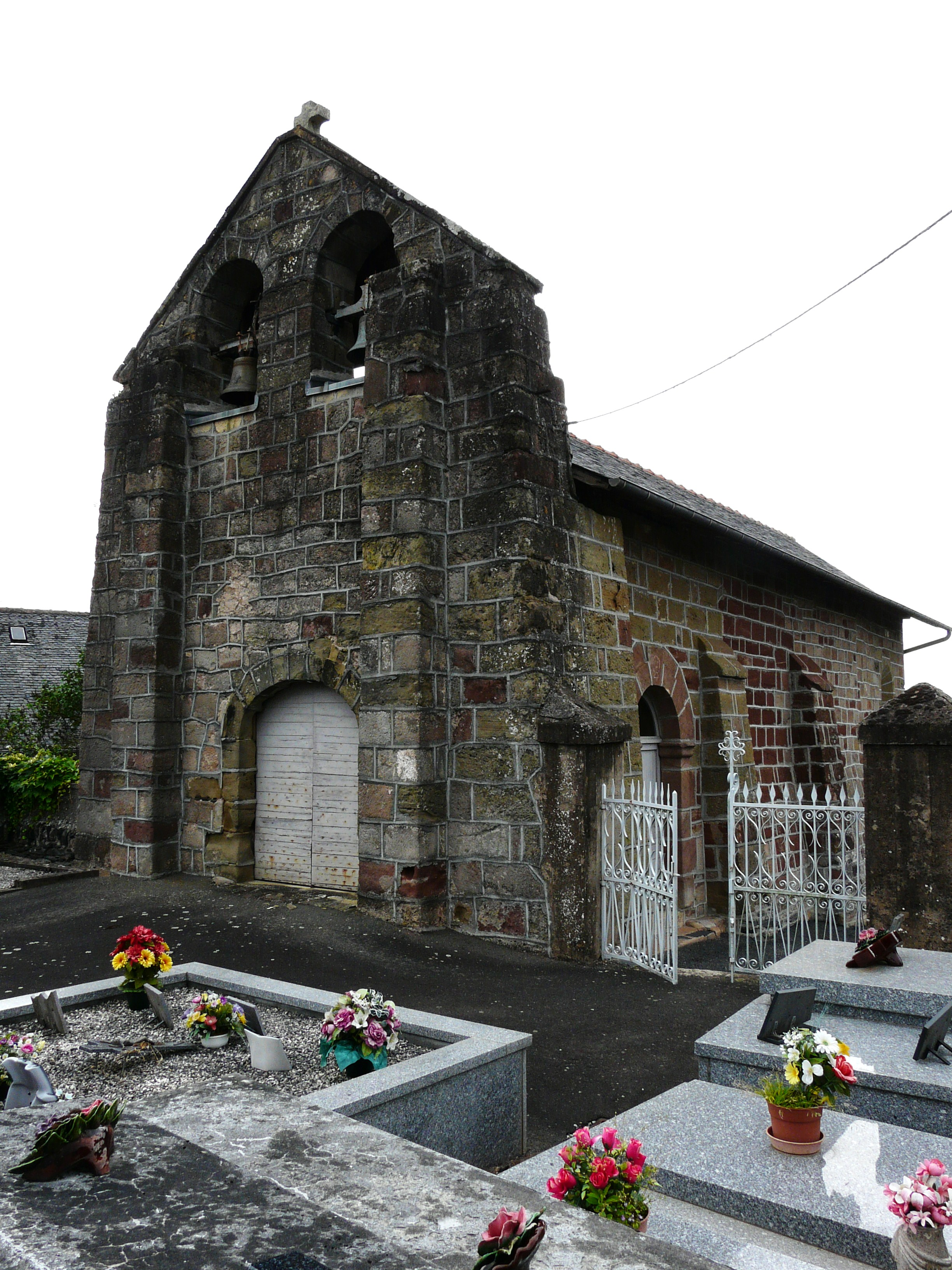
The Chapel Saint-Laurent

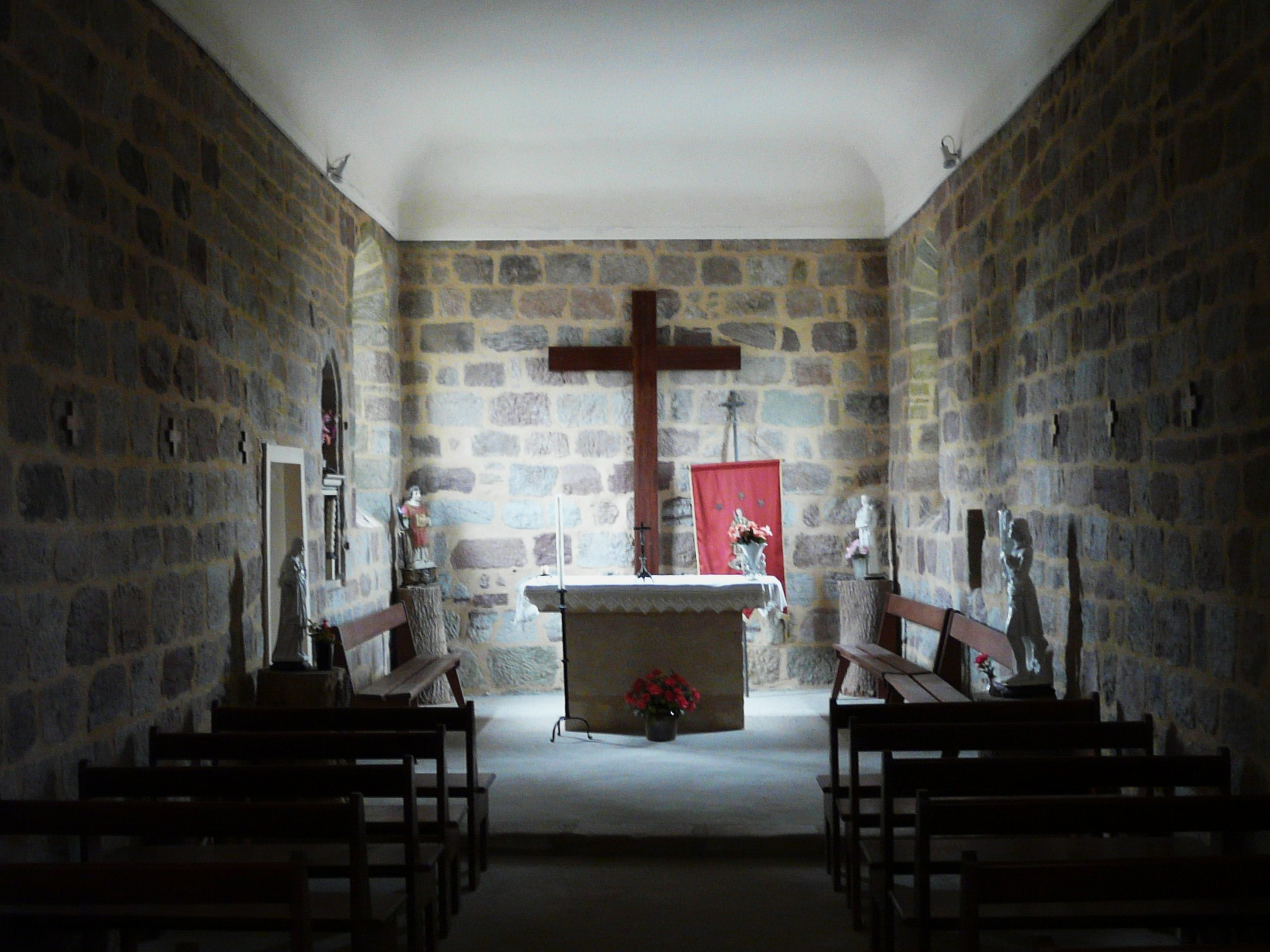
The interior of the Chapel Saint-Laurent

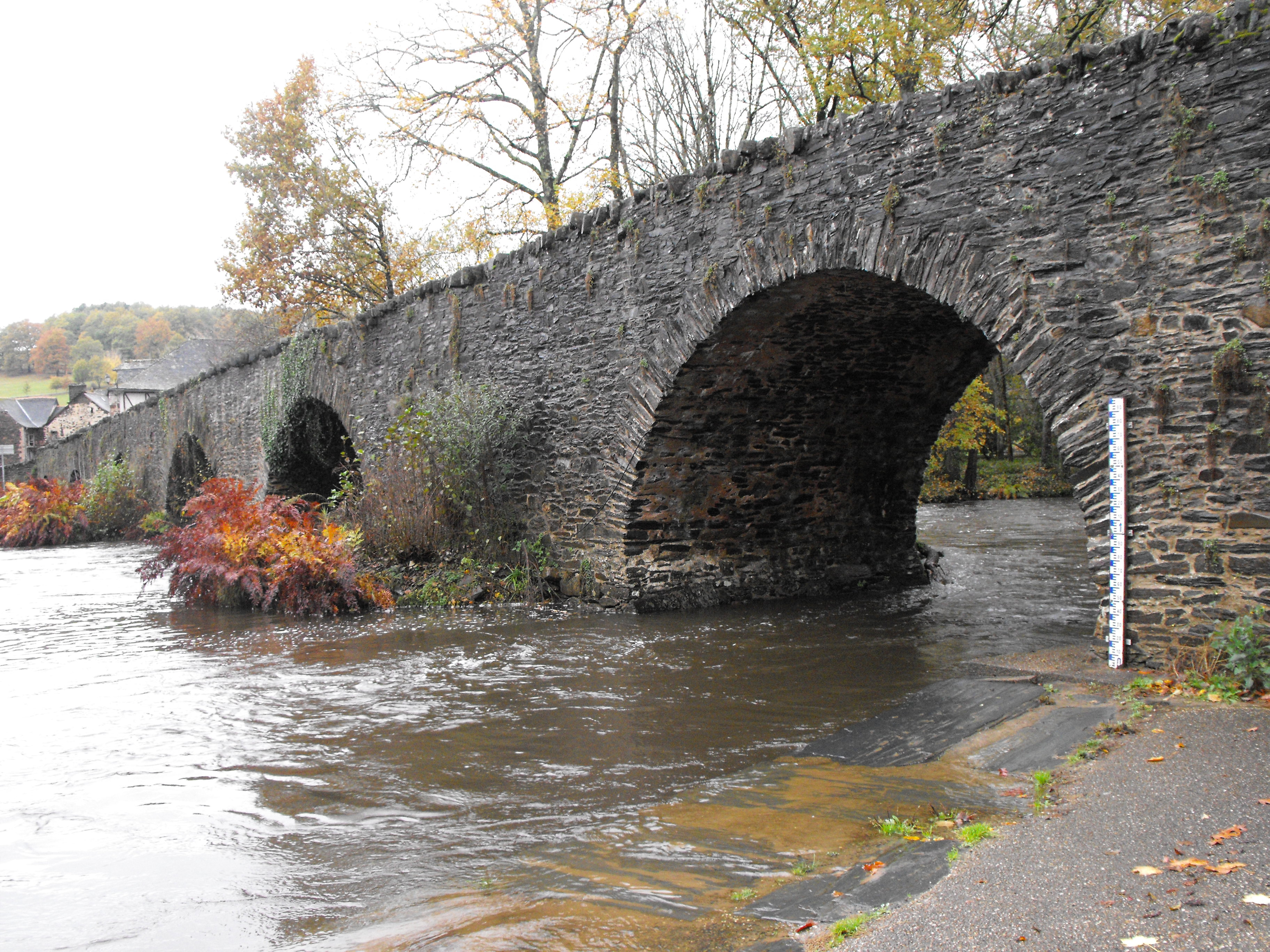
The bridge of Saillant, on the right the two arches next to Allassac

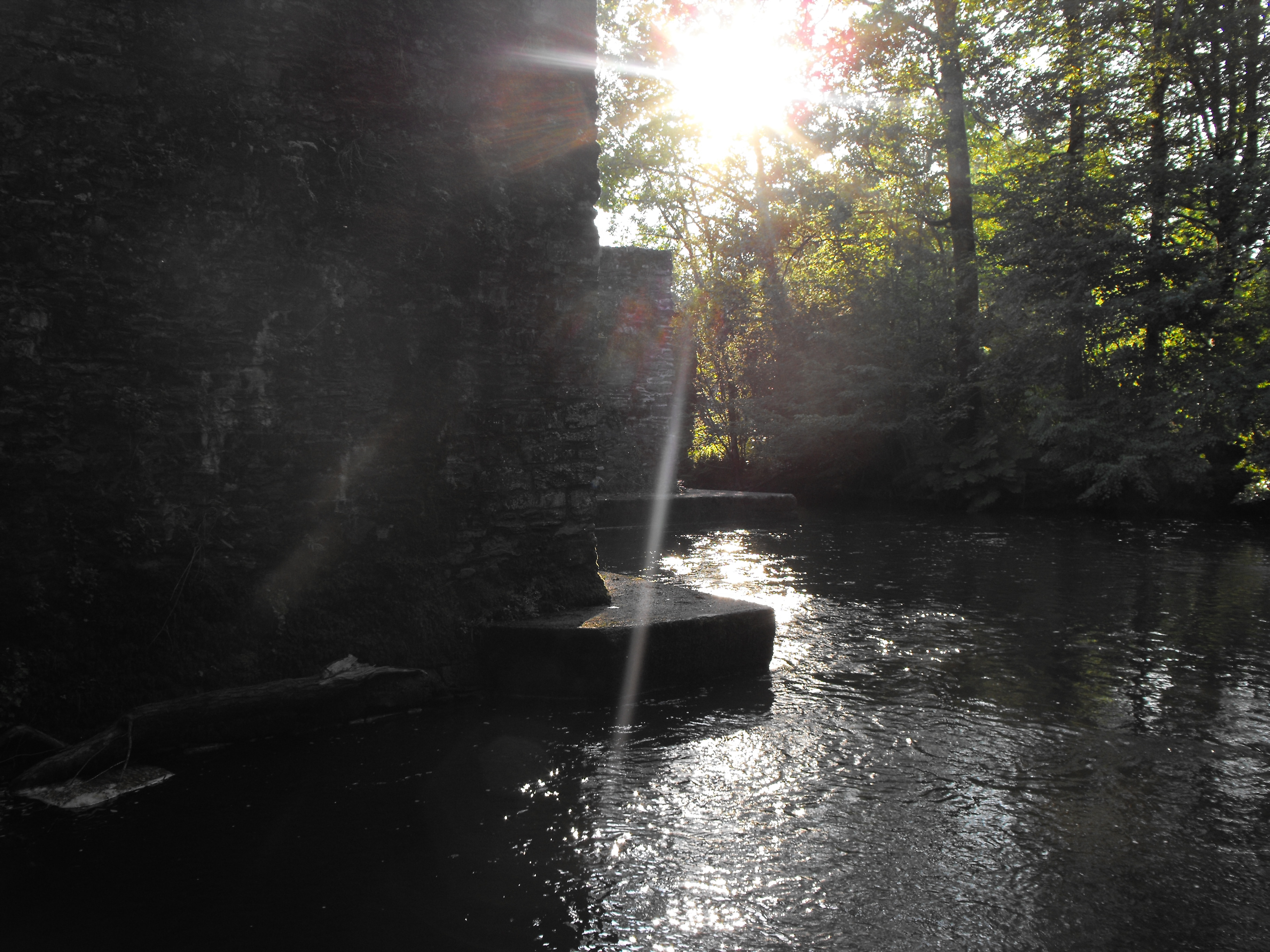
Becs from the old bridge

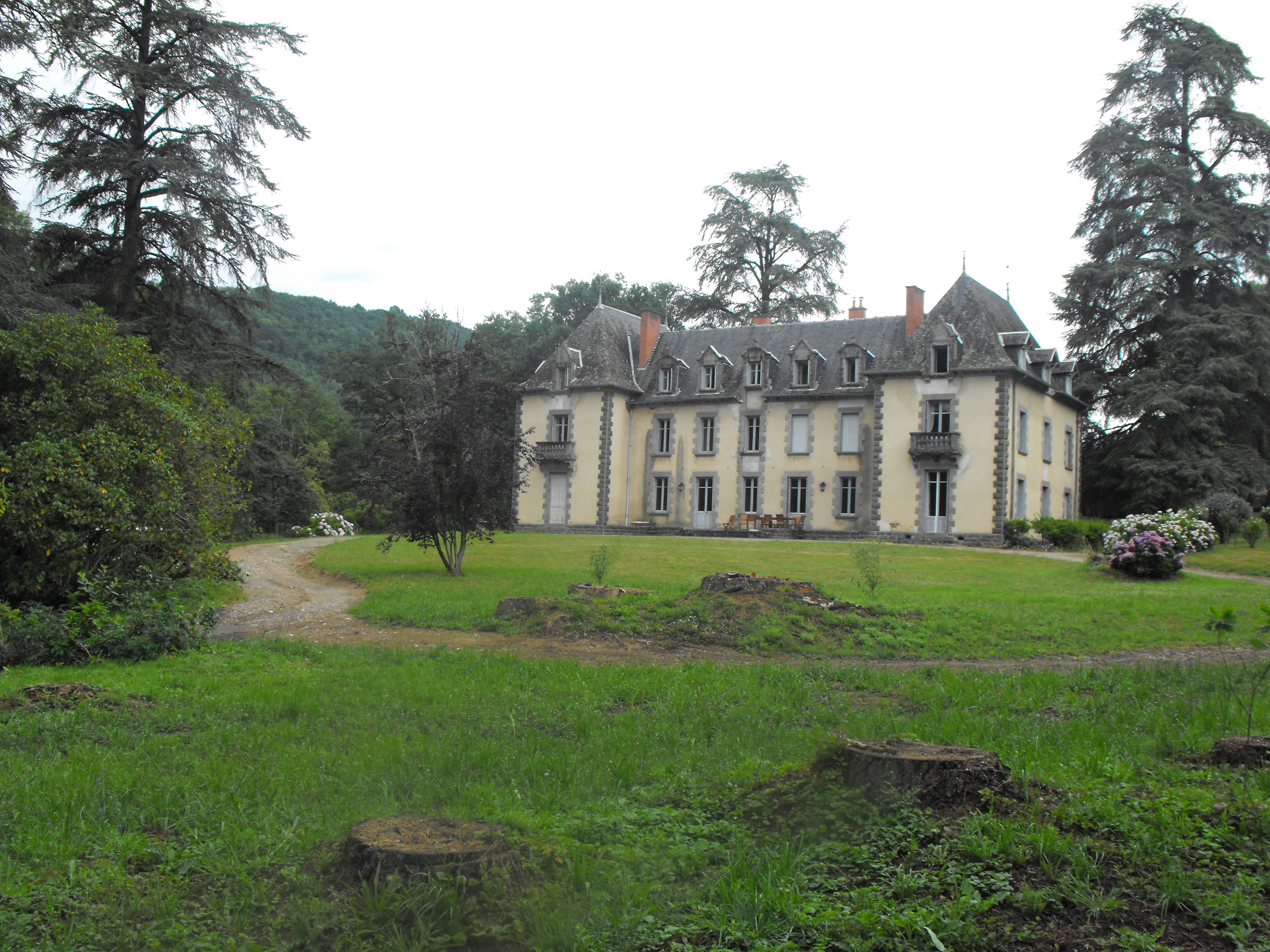
Lasteyrie du Saillant Castle (a house from the 19th century)

== Notable people linked to the commune ==
- Raynaud de La Porte, Cardinal Bishop of Ostia (+1325)
- Aymard de Foucauld, (1824-1863), an officer of the French Army
- Élie Dufaure, (1824-1865), Doctor of Laws, Lawyer at the Imperial Court of Paris.
- The Lasteyrie du Saillant family:
  - Charles Philibert de Lasteyrie
  - Ferdinand Charles Leon Lasteyrie
  - Robert Charles de Lasteyrie
  - Charles de Lasteyrie
- Georges Mamy, (1921-1997), journalist and writer, was born in Allassac.
- Jean-Louis Lascaux, Knight of the National Order of Merit, director of the Centre médico-psycho-pédagogique (CMPP) of Tulle and the director of the same at Brive unifying the fifteen towns of the Country of Art and History into Vézère Ardoise
- Aurélien Beco, born in 1986, rugby player originally from Allassac
- Bertrand de Chanac

== See also ==
- Gare d'Allassac
- Communes of the Corrèze department
