= Allassac station =

Railway station in Allassac, France

Coordinates: 45°15′31″N 1°28′23″E

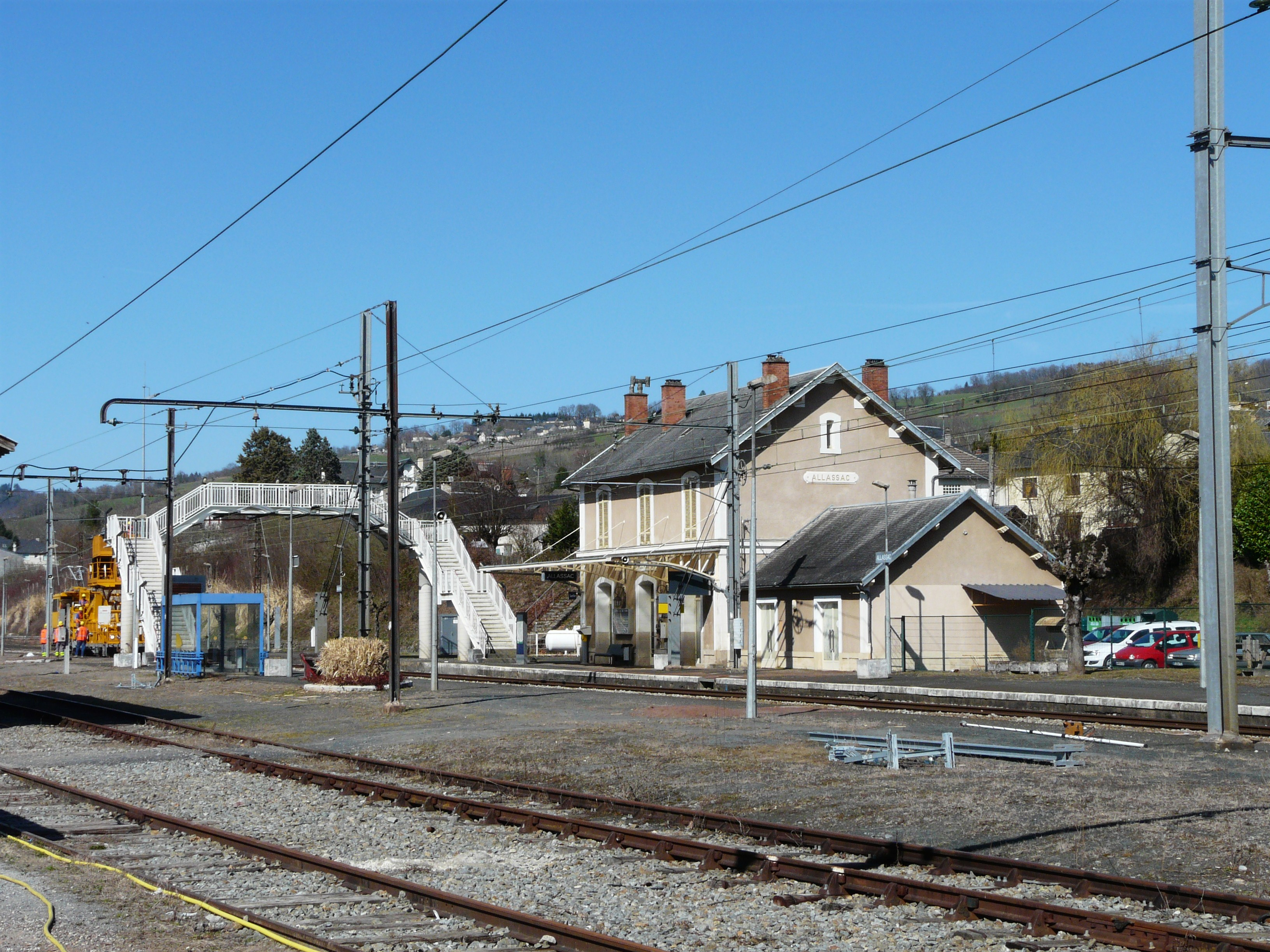
Allassac station

Allassac is a railway station in Allassac, Nouvelle-Aquitaine, France. The station is located on the Orléans–Montauban railway line. The station is served by TER (local) services operated by SNCF.

== Train services ==
The following services currently call at Allassac:

- Local service (TER Nouvelle-Aquitaine) Limoges - Uzerche - Brive-la-Gaillarde

Preceding station	TER Nouvelle-Aquitaine	Following station
Vigeois towards Limoges	22	Brive-la-Gaillarde Terminus
