= Vigeois station =

Railway station in Vigeois, France

Coordinates: 45°22′58″N 1°30′55″E

Vigeois is a railway station in Vigeois, Nouvelle-Aquitaine, France. The station is located on the Orléans–Montauban railway line. The station is served by TER (local) services operated by SNCF.

== Train services ==
The following services currently call at Vigeois:

- local service (TER Nouvelle-Aquitaine) Limoges - Uzerche - Brive-la-Gaillarde

Preceding station	TER Nouvelle-Aquitaine	Following station
Uzerche towards Limoges	22	Allassac towards Brive-la-Gaillarde
