= Canton of Vigeois =

Coordinates: 45°22′49″N 1°31′05″E

Vigeois
- Former canton
- Interactive map of Vigeois
- Country: France
- Region: Nouvelle-Aquitaine
- Department: Corrèze
- No. of communes: {{{nbcomm}}}
- Disbanded: 2015
- Area: 134.95 km^{2} (52.10 sq mi)
- Population (2012): 3,908
  - Density: 28.96/km^{2} (75.00/sq mi)

The canton of Vigeois is a former administrative division situated in the Corrèze département and in the Limousin region of France. It was disbanded following the French canton reorganisation which came into effect in March 2015. It consisted of 6 communes, which joined the canton of Allassac in 2015. It had 3,908 inhabitants (2012).

The canton comprised the following communes:

- Estivaux
- Orgnac-sur-Vézère
- Perpezac-le-Noir
- Saint-Bonnet-l'Enfantier
- Troche
- Vigeois

== Demographics ==
Historical population Canton of Vigeois
| Year | 1962 | 1968 | 1975 | 1982 | 1990 | 1999 | 2006 | 2007 | 2008 |
| Pop. | 4,038 | 4,456 | 3,924 | 3,742 | 3,541 | 3,437 | 3,602 | 3,647 | - |
| ±% | — | +10.4% | −11.9% | −4.6% | −5.4% | −2.9% | +4.8% | +1.2% | — |
From the year 1962 on: No double counting – residents of multiple communes (e.g. students and military personnel) are counted only once. Source: INSEE

== See also ==
- Cantons of the Corrèze department
