= Thiviers-Payzac Unit =

The Thiviers-Payzac Unit is a metasedimentary succession of late Neoproterozoic and Cambrian age outcropping in the southern Limousin in France. The unit geologically forms part of the Variscan basement of the northwestern Massif Central.

== Terminology ==
The Thiviers-Payzac Unit, sometimes still called Thiviers-Payzac Nappe or Bas-Limousin Group, was named after Thiviers and Payzac, two small towns in the northeastern Dordogne situated within the unit's outcrop area. The term nappe is somewhat misleading.

== Geography ==
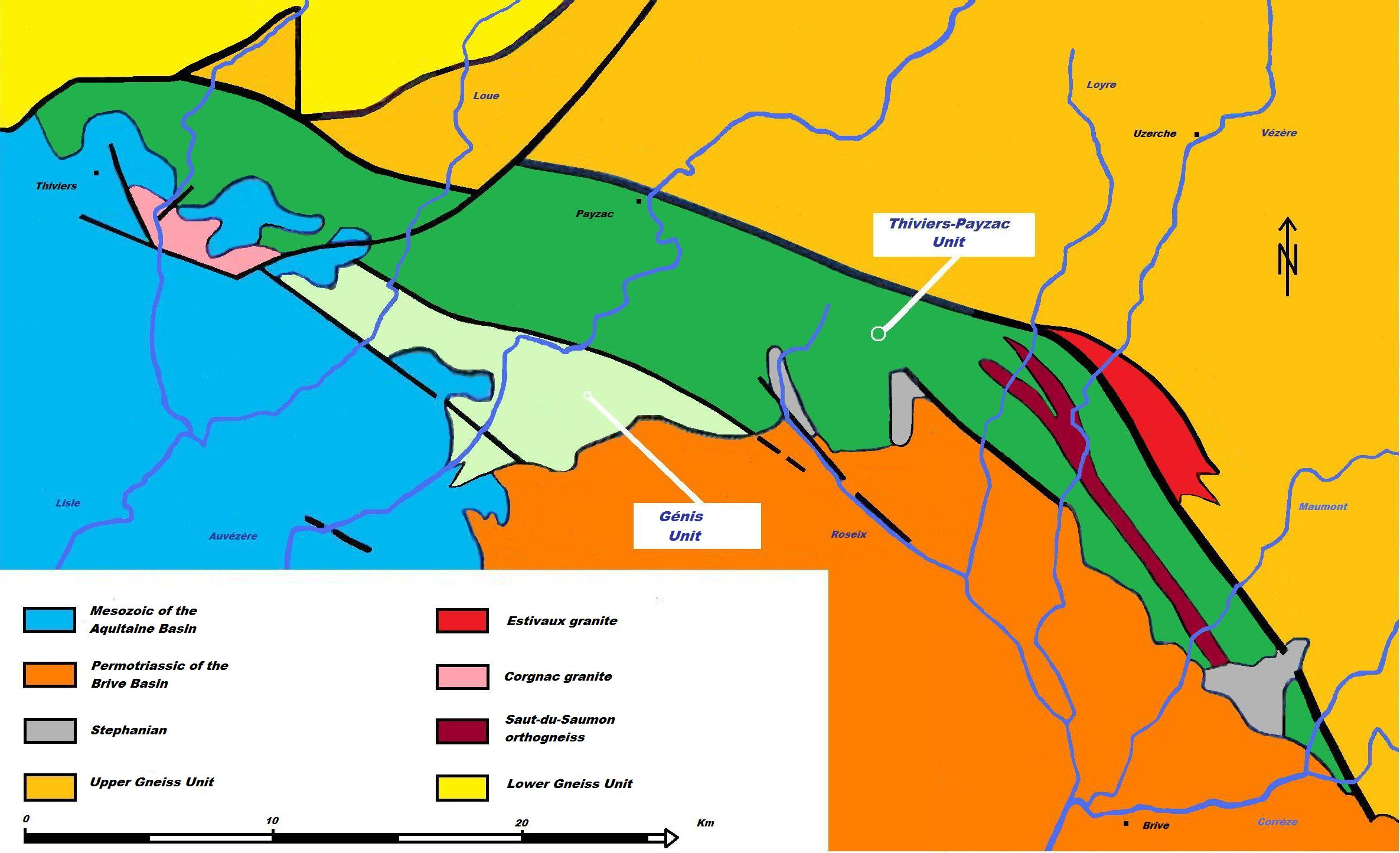
Geological map showing the position of the Thiviers-Payzac Unit.

Geographically the Thiviers-Payzac Unit belongs to the Bas-Limousin (southern Limousin), a plateau peneplained during the Eocene and whose elevation barely reaches above 400 metres. The unit starts just west of Thiviers in the northern Dordogne and then follows for 70 kilometres a semicircular arc segment, passing through Lanouaille, Payzac, Orgnac, Donzenac and finishing just east of Brive in the Corrèze. In the beginning the unit follows a WNW-ESE strike (N110), but then just north of Orgnac swings into a NW-SE course (N 135). On its north side the unit is separated by the Estivaux Fault, a left-lateral, ductile strike-slip fault, from rocks of the Upper Gneiss Unit. On its western end appear rocks of the Lower Gneiss Unit. In the southwest the unit is overlain by liassic sediments of the Aquitaine Basin. The South Limousin Fault, also a ductile strike-slip fault but with a right-lateral shear, separates the unit from the Génis Unit in the south. The unit finally disappears in the southeast below some small occurrences of Pennsylvanian sediments, yet the bulk of the unit is covered mainly by Permotriassic red beds of the Brive Basin. Following the Auvézère the maximum width of the unit across strike is only 9 kilometers.

Just northwest of Terrasson in the eastern Dordogne there is an upfaulted basement high, that is also included within the main unit. This outlier is about 10 kilometers long and also follows the ESE-direction; its width across strike is only 5 kilometers.

== Stratigraphy ==
The stratigraphy of the Thiviers-Payzac Unit shows the following succession (from top to bottom):

- Puy-des-Âges quartzite
- Engastine mafics
- Donzenac schist
- Thiviers sandstone

The unit hosts the Mississippian Estivaux granite and two Ordovician granitoids, the Saut-du-Saumon orthogneiss and the Corgnac granite.

=== Puy-des-Âges quartzite ===
The Puy-des-Âges quartzite on top is a very resistant, white, sericite-bearing quartzite and consequently forms erosion-resistant reliefs within the plateau of the Bas-Limousin. The formation crops out in a merely 200 meter wide band in the western and central part of the Thiviers-Payzac Unit. The quartzite shows similarities to the Puy-de-Cornut-Arkose of the Génis Unit. Even a relationship with the grès armoricain in Brittany is taken into consideration. Its age is therefore most likely Ordovician (Tremadocian).

=== Engastine mafics ===
The underlying Engastine Mafics are a complex of mafic, magmatic rocks. They likewise appear only in the western and central Thiviers-Payzac Unit. In a 500 Meter wide strip they follow immediately to the south of the Puy-des-Âges quartzite. Near Juillac this strip widens to about 2 kilometers. The age of the maximally 500 meter thick mafic rocks is taken to be Cambrian. They consist of alternating greenschists and amphibolites in which are intercalated several layers of metadolerites and metagabbros. The very fine grained greenschist of light green to dark green colour contains as major constituents the minerals plagioclase (oligoclase or andesine), amphibole (hornblende) and epidote (clinozoisite). Biotite is a minor constituent and quartz, calcite and opaques are accessories. The greenschist represents ancient subalkaline basalts. The metadolerites and the metagabbros are much more coarse-grained and consist mainly of hornblende and basic plagioclase that has undergone saussuritisation.

=== Donzenac Schist ===
Below the Engastine mafic complex follows the epizonal (low-grade) Donzenac Schist. The schist crops out in a 3 kilometer wide, slightly curved band that starts at the type locality Donzenac and extends to Lanouaille. Here the band is cut off by the left-lateral Dussac Fault, a major strike-slip fault, and offset by several kilometers to the southwest. The band then follows through to just northeast of Thiviers, where it ends. The Donzenac schist is also included in the Cambrian. The schist has silky hues of grey and is mostly made up of phyllosilicates like muscovite and biotite or muscovite and chlorite. The phyllosilicates are accompanied by quartz, acid plagioclase and garnet of the almandine zone. The schist sometimes reveals relatively fine-grained, decimeter-sized, dark interlayers of arenitic composition, most likely ancient greywackes. The arenitic interlayers show clasts of quartz, plagioclase and epidote surrounded by newly formed minerals like phyllosilicates, quartz and very fine-grained albite.

=== Thiviers sandstone ===
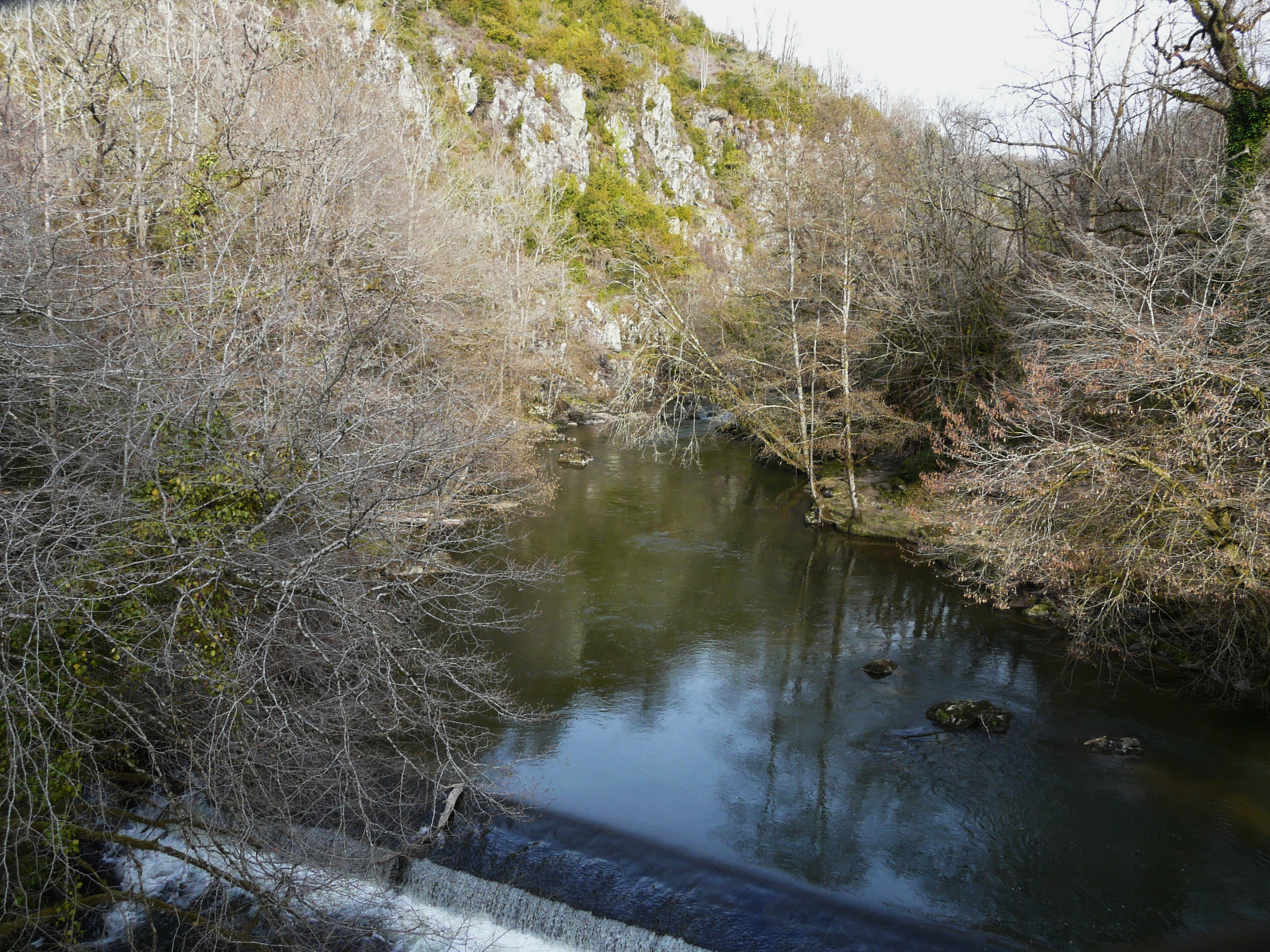
Near Saint-Mesmin the Auvézère cuts through the Thiviers Sandstone, a formation of the Thiviers-Payzac Unit.

The Thiviers sandstone is the lowermost formation in the Thiviers-Payzac Unit appearing at the surface, taking up about two thirds of its total surface area. The formation is a detrital, volcanic succession of late Neoproterozoic and Cambrian age. It can be subdivided into four different facies:

- medium- to coarse-grained greywackes.
- sandy schists and rhyodacitic tuffs.
- polygenetic and intraformational conglomerates.
- quartzites formed from recrystallised sandstones.

Innumerable, meter-sized doleritic dikes cut through the formation inducing local contact metamorphism.

The term “sandstone” is somewhat misleading, because the formation is clearly dominated by the rhyodacitic tuffs of volcanic origin, all the other facies merely being alteration products. The once sodium-rich rhyodacitic tuffs have now become dark, massive and thickly bedded rocks. Lodged within a fine-grained matrix of chlorite, white mica, quartz and albite are millimeter-sized clasts of quartz, plagioclase (albite or oligoclase) and epidote. The following observations underline the explosive character of the volcanic rocks:

- fragmented quartz crystals with sharp, pointed edges and tips.
- broken, pointed plagioclase.
- Rock fragments of once albite-rich, leucocratic lava.

The greywackes are mineralogically very similar, but richer in quartz phenocrysts and their matrix is enriched in phyllosilicates. They are probably derived from the rhyodacites. Likewise the chemical composition of the quartzites, which is almost identical to the ryhodacites!

The underlying formations of the Thiviers sandstone – plagioclase-rich paragneisses and micaschists – are nowhere exposed.

=== Intrusive rocks ===
As already mentioned before the Thiviers-Payzac Unit houses three different magmatic bodies:

- Saut-du-Saumon orthogneiss.
- Corgnac granite.
- Estivaux granite.

==== Saut-du-Saumon orthogneiss ====
The prekinematic Saut-du-Saumon orthogneiss is a 15 kilometer long, very drawn out, squid-like, NW-SE-striking granitic body, whose tail starts at Donzenac in the south and whose tentacles end in the Orgnac region near the river Loyre.

The orthogneiss is made up of eye-shaped, subcentimeter-sized alkali feldspar porphyroclasts and is therefore an augengneiss. Its matrix consists of quartz and feldspars. The biotite has aligned itself parallel to sigmoidal shear bands. The porphyroclasts have been broken and sheared left-laterally along parallel fractures.

The entire body of the orthogneiss is intensively foliated in a NW-SE fashion. The foliation planes are close to vertical and contain horizontal lineations also striking NW-SE. The rock is therefore a S-L tectonite. Along its borders with the enclosing formations (Thiviers sandstone and Donzenac schist) mylonites and ultramylonites with sinistral shear sense have formed. In its interior dextral and sinistral shearing interfere in a non-coaxial fashion.

The protolith of the orthogneiss was once a porphyritic granitoid which was later on (during the Variscan orogeny) deformed plastically. Its original cooling age has been determined as middle Ordovician (Acadian phase). According to Bernard-Griffiths (1977) the mylonitic deformations took place close to the Devonian/Carboniferous boundary about 361 million years ago.

==== Corgnac granite ====
The Corgnac granite is a 6.5 kilometer long massif within the Thiviers sandstone. It is aligned more or less parallel with the regional foliation. Across strike it is only 2.5 kilometers wide. Its intrusive granitic nature is demonstrated by occasional hornfelses along its edges. Like the very similar Saut-du-Saumon orthogneiss the Corgnac granite also intruded during the middle Ordovician about 470 million years ago. The granite was overprinted at about 350 million years ago during the regional metamorphism under retrograde conditions. Its chemical composition defines it as a subalkaline monzogranite.

Two very different facies can be distinguished in the Corgnac granite:

- cataclastic granitic facies in the south.
- porphyroclastic orthogneissic facies in the north.

The equigranular, sometimes porphyric, grey to rose-coloured granitic facies contains the following minerals:

- interstitial quartz
- plagioclase – often zoned, of basic composition
- microcline – often perthitic
- biotite

Accessory minerals are muscovite, zircon, apatite and opaques.

All these minerals were altered during the greenschist facies retromorphism. Biotite and quartz for instance were broken cataclastically, plagioclase was invaded by muscovite and clinozoisite and rutile needles exsolved from biotite. The granitic facies has produced several smaller, porphyric, microgranitic apophyses.

The orthogneissic facies is derived from the granitic facies, it only underwent a stronger ductile deformation. The facies presents itself now as a banded augengneiss with amygdular eyes of microcline and plagioclase surrounded by foliation minerals like very fine quartz, albite, granular clinozoisite and mica lamellae. The biotite is often chloritized. The shear sense has not been determined, but most likely is right-lateral judging by the Corgnac granite being part of the southern section of the Thiviers-Payzac Unit.

==== Estivaux Granite ====
The synkinematic Estivaux granite is a calc-alkaline massif of magmatic origin that was deformed heterogeneously about 346 million years ago during the Tournaisian. Like the Saut-du-Saumon orthogneiss its shape is also squid-like developing tentacular arms at its northern gneissic and also mylonitic end. The granite is about 8 kilometers long in the NW-SE direction and 3 kilometers wide across strike. In the northeast the left-lateral Estivaux strike-slip fault separates the massif from rocks of the Upper Gneiss Unit. In the southwest it is surrounded by the Thiviers sandstone. Its southeastern limited is outlined by the Clan river.

The granite develops four different facies:

- melanocratic facies.
- leucocratic facies.
- white facies.
- pink facies.

Its mineralogy (in the melanocratic facies) shows the following composition:

- As porphyroclasts:
  - orthoclase – can attain a grain size of 4 millimeters, the porphyroclasts are partially broken and filled in by microaplite.
- Essential minerals in the submillimeter to millimeter range are:
  - quartz
  - microcline
  - plagioclase (albite/oligoclase)
  - biotite – also as porphyroclasts, with inclusions of zircon
  - muscovite
  - green hornblende – also as porphyroclasts
- Accessory minerals are
  - sphene
  - zircon
  - myrmekite

The melanocratic facies contains many mafic enclaves and schlieren. The white and the pink facies are a more fine-grained variation of the melanocratic facies, they also lack hornblende and sphene. Their mutual colour difference is due to the coloration of the feldspars, the pink facies most likely being richer in hematite. The leucocratic facies can be regarded as a strongly sheared leucogranite that is very rich in muscovite.

The granite therefore possesses a pronounced gradient in deformation and in mineral alignment as one progresses from west to east. Approaching the S-C mylonitic, sinistral Estivaux Fault the little deformed melanocratic facies yields to the strongly deformed leucocratic facies, at the same time the contents in microaplite (representing a residual melt) descend from 20% to merely 5%.

The shear sense in the Estivaux granite is uniformly sinistral.

== Structural organisation ==
The entire Thiviers-Payzac Unit is intensively folded. Similar as in the Génis Unit the folding is tight and upright and the wavelength even somewhat shorter (100 to 125 metres, but can increase in the south to about 200 metres). The more or less horizontal fold axes strike WNW-ESE (N 110, west of the Loyre river). The stratification (S_{0}) is steeply inclined (around 80 °) and north or south dipping. Parallel to the folds axial plane a recognisable schistosity (S_{1}) has developed underlined by newly formed minerals. The tight folding is overprinted by a second fold generation of open folds that have generated a very long wavelength (about 2 kilometers) series of synclines and anticlines. The axis of the first syncline is situated right next to the South Limousin Fault, followed by the first anticline underneath Saint-Mesmin. The second, central syncline is outlined by the trace of the Puy-des-Âges quartzite and the second anticline runs through Saint-Cyr-les-Champagnes.

A crenulation lineation has also formed which trends more or less parallel to the folds. Newly formed metamorphic minerals also align themselves preferably in this direction.

After reaching the Loyre river the Thiviers-Payzac unit makes a definitive right-hand turn and all the structural elements swing into the NW-SE direction (N 135). This new trend is followed till the unit finally disappears just east of Brive.

== Metamorphism ==
The Thiviers-Payzac Unit experienced regional metamorphism under low to medium grade. Its upper reaches show upper greenschist facies conditions, the lower sections reached already lower amphibolite facies conditions. The presence of chlorite and chloritized biotite in shear bands and in pressure shadows indicates retrograde metamorphism, which has been known in the southern Limousin for quite a while.

== Structural evolution ==
Like the Génis Unit the Thivier-Payzac Unit was also affected by upright ductile shearing. But unlike the Génis Unit it does not possess a uniform shear sense. In the south the unit shows the same dextral shear sense as the Génis Unit right to the anticline at Saint-Mesmin. Farther to the northeast this is superseded by a mixed zone where both shear senses are present. When finally the northern outcrop band of the Thiviers sandstone is reached only sinistral shearing is preserved in the rocks. This sinistral shear sense becomes clearly evident close to the Estivaux Fault. Here the shear coefficient γ takes on the value of 5.4 which represents an accumulated left-lateral displacement of about 30 kilometers. As regards the granitoids the Saut-du-Saumon orthogneiss is affected by two shear senses whereas the Estivaux granite has been deformed solely left-laterally.

The following microtectonic methods underline the sinistral shear sense in the northern outcrop area of the Thiviers sandstone:

- analysis of quartz <c> axes – displaced in the direction of shearing – sinistral.
- interpretation of asymmetric quartz pressure shadows around garnet – clearly sinistral.
- interpretation of porphyroclasts of the σ-type (in the Thiviers greywacke).
- interpretation of shear bands – clearly sinistral (in the Donzenac schist near Allassac).
- interpretation of quartz pressure shadows on biotite porphyroblasts – sinistral.

North of Saint-Cyr-les-Champagnes the neighbouring Upper Gneiss Unit also shows a left-lateral shear sense (sinistrally sheared quartz lenses).

In the Donzenac Schist, where both shear senses are present, one can observe how the dextral shearing is overprinting the sinistral shearing. The sinistral movements happened therefore later. On left-laterally sheared, sigmoidal porphyroblasts of biotite dextral shear bands are superimposed on; additionally retrograde chlorite formed in these late shear bands.

The pervasive shearing is responsible for the folding in the Thiviers-Payzac Unit; the folds can be interpreted as tear folds that were rotated into the maximum stretching direction in a transpressive, ductile shear zone.

The tectonic movements didn't stop at the close of the ductile deformations. For instance in the brittle realm many small, mainly NE-SW-striking strike-slip faults were initiated with left-lateral displacements in the order of about 500 meters – an exception being the Dussac Fault north of Lanouaille which has a left-lateral displacement of nearly 6 kilometers!

== Timing of the deformations ==
The timing of the tectonic movements is based mainly on comparisons with lithologically and structurally similar terranes in the Armorican Massif (Chantonnay Syncline in the Vendée) and in the Rouergue. In the southern Armorican Massif the dextral shearing motions are timed as Namurian and Westphalian (Serpukhovian till Moscovian), i.e. 325 till 305 million years ago. One can therefore propose for the deformations in the Thiviers-Payzac Unit of the Bas-Limousin, which is regarded as the southeastern prolongation of the Vendée, a middle to late Carboniferous age. Similar ages for the leucogranites in the northern and central Limousin seem to support this assumption.

Yet some radiometric datings using the argon-method find much earlier Tournaisian ages for the intrusion of the Estivaux granite and for the motions along mylonite zones within the Saut-du-Saumon orthogneiss. These findings imply a tectonic phase in the southern Limousin already during Mississippian times (Bretonic Phase).

== Sources ==
- Peterlongo, J.M. (1978). Massif Central. Guides Géologiques Régionaux. Masson. ISBN 2-225-49753-2
- Roig, J.-Y., Faure, M. & Ledru, P.(1996). Polyphase wrench tectonics in the southern French Massif Central: kinematic inferences from pre- and syntectonic granitoids. Geologische Rundschau, 85, pp. 138–153
