= Ugu (disambiguation) =

Ugu is a town in Uttar Pradesh, India.

Ugu or UGU may also refer to:

== Places ==
- Ugu Island (Ugu-shima), a small islet in Hakata Bay, Japan
- Mount Ugu, a mountain in the Philippines
- Ugu District Municipality, a district of KwaZulu-Natal province, South Africa

== Food and culture ==
- Telfairia occidentalis, an African leaf-vegetable
- Ugu, a week in the Balinese Pawukon calendar
- Ugu, a Cherokee high-priest's title of the ancient Kituwa settlement, North Carolina, United States
- Ugu the Shoemaker, a fictional villain from the Oz books by L. Frank Baum
- "Ugū" (うぐぅ), a catch phrase uttered by Kanon character Ayu Tsukimiya

== Other uses ==
- UGU, a genetic codon sequence of cysteine
- Upper Gneiss Unit, a structural unit in geology (plate tectonics), see Thiviers-Payzac Unit
- Zugapa Airport, Indonesia (IATA airport code: UGU)
- University of Glamorgan Union, Treforest, Wales
- University Graduates Union, the founding non-profit organization of the Palestine Polytechnic University, Hebron, Palestine

== See also ==
- Ugwu (disambiguation)
