= Génis Unit =

The Génis Unit is a Paleozoic metasedimentary succession of the southern Limousin and belongs geologically to the Variscan basement of the French Massif Central. The unit covers the age range Cambrian/Ordovician till Devonian.

== Type locality ==
The Génis Unit was named after its type locality, the small town Génis, situated in the northeastern Dordogne.

== Geographical Occurrence ==
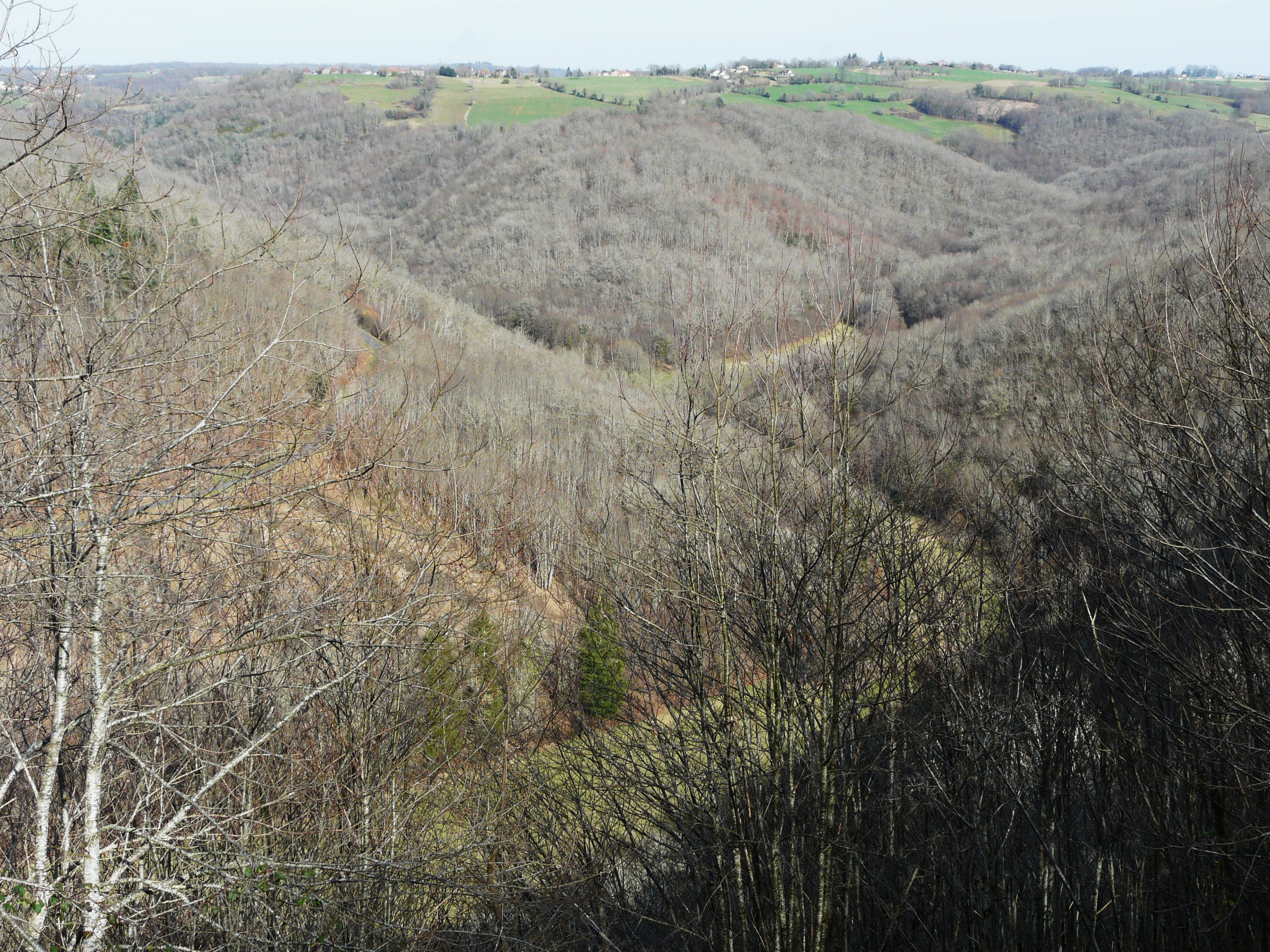
The canyon of the Auvézère between Génis and Saint-Mesmin exposes here mainly the Génis porphyroid. In the background the peneplained plateau of the Bas Limousin with the Thiviers-Payzac Unit.

The Génis Unit occurs in an elongated strip at the northeastern edge of the Dordogne department, following a WNW-ESE direction for about 26 kilometres. Its width across strike is not more than 5 kilometres. The unit forms part of the Bas Limousin, a basement plateau that was peneplained during the Paleogene. The plateau's elevation oscillates between 300 and 400 meters. Geologically the unit's northern limit is the South Limousin Fault, a very important ductile, dextral wrench fault separating the Génis Unit from the Thiviers-Payzac Unit to the north. To the south the unit is overlain by liassic sediments of the Aquitaine Basin. In the east the group disappears beneath Permian red beds of the Brive Basin. Its sedimentary succession can be best studied along the Auvézère river.

Comparable units to the Génis Unit with an identical stratigraphic succession can be found in the Vendée and in the Rouergue.

== Stratigraphy ==
The Génis Unit shows the following stratigraphic succession (from top to bottom):

- Génis greenschist
- Génis sericite schist
- Puy-de-Cornut arkose
- Génis porphyroid

=== Génis greenschist ===
The Génis greenschist is the youngest formation of the Génis Unit. The greenschist derives from mafic magmatic rocks like gabbro and basaltic pillow lava, basic volcanoclastics and rare intercalations of chert and pelite. A lower Devonian age can be attributed to the greenschist.

Incorporated at the base of the greenschist are limestone lenses containing upper Silurian conodonts.

=== Génis sericite schist ===
The underlying Génis sericite schist is very rich in the minerals quartz, chlorite and muscovite (variety sericite). The sericite schist is probably of Ordovician and lower Silurian age (rare finds of Ordovician acritarchs have been made).

=== Puy-de-Cornut arkose ===
Below the Génis sericite schist follows the Puy-de-Cornut arkose. The arkose is strongly silicified and forms erosionally resistant morphological ridges. It is supposed to be an equivalent of the Puy-des-Âges quartzite from the neighbouring Thiviers-Payzac Unit. A close relationship with the Grès Armoricain in Brittany is also considered. Therefore, an Ordovician age of the arkose is most likely.

=== Génis porphyroid ===
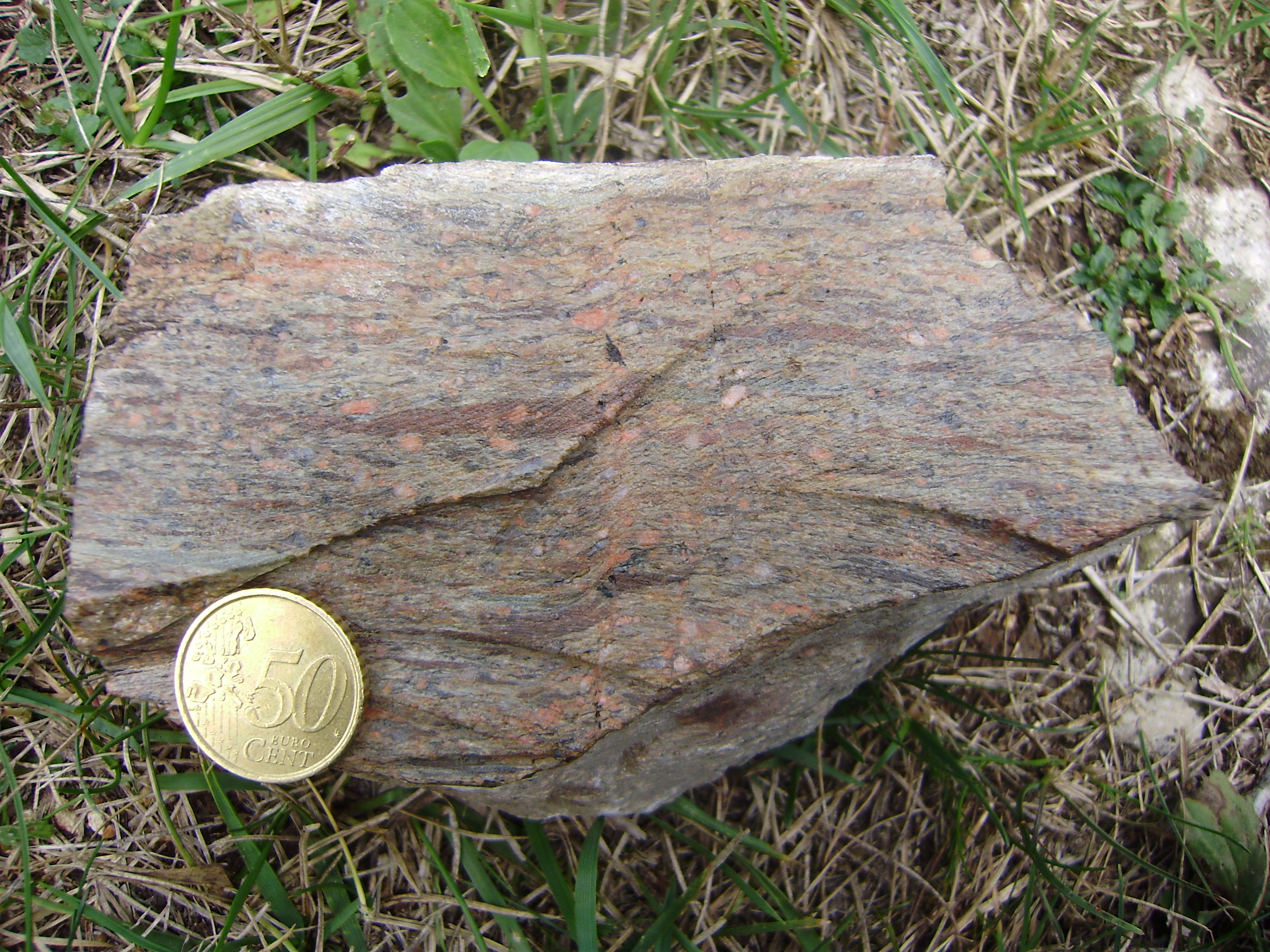
Sawn sample of the Génis porphyroid showing a dextral shear sense.

Below a pronounced angular unconformity one encounters the Génis porphyroid. This rock represents alkaline, rhyolitic ignimbrites (metaignimbrites) of lower Ordovician age (Tremadocian). Its mineralogy is composed of phenocrysts of quartz, alkali feldspar and plagioclase (albite) and a very fine-grained matrix (grain-size 5 μ) made of quartz, feldspars, sericite and rare chlorite. Original fiamme are hard to discern, but welded glassy layers are recognisable. The metaignimbrite is rich in potassium and contains more than 70% of SiO_{2}.

Underlying the Génis porphyroid are the Donzenac schist and the Thiviers sandstone, the main formations of the Thiviers-Payzac Unit. In the Fugeyrollas anticline the Thiviers sandstone appears on the surface and thus also crops out within the Génis Unit. Both formations are supposed to cover the age range Neoproterozoic to Cambrian.

== Structural organisation ==
The Génis Unit is thoroughly folded into tight, upright folds with a wavelength of about 150 meters. The fold axes strike WNW-ESE (N 110) with a slight dip of about 10 ° to the east. The original sedimentary layering (S_{0}) can often still be recognised dipping 75 to 80 ° to the north or to the south. Parallel to the folds' axial plane a distinct schistosity has developed (S_{1}). The tight folds are overprinted by secondary folding and deformed into large anticlines and synclines with a wavelength of about 2 kilometers (Cubas syncline in the south followed by the Fougeyrollas anticline and the Génis syncline to the north). Imprinted on the layering are well developed stretching lineations also running more or less parallel to the fold axes. Newly formed metamorphic minerals are preferably arranged along this direction, although their lineations stray between N 110 and N 135. Furthermore, the lineations are accompanied by microfolds, whose axes yet again follow the N 110-direction.

== Metamorphism and structural evolution ==
During the Variscan orogeny the original sedimentary succession of the Génis Unit subsided and was metamorphosed due to increasing overburden. The metamorphism followed a retrograde path (neoformation of chlorite) and recorded the epizonal conditions of the greenschist facies. This fact is very important for the geology of the Massif Central, because low-grade metamorphic successions are underrepresented and quite rare. Usually the metasediments in the Massif Central are strongly deformed and metamorphosed (under amphibolite facies conditions) and therefore only rough guesses can be made about their protoliths.

The retrograde metamorphism is known in other places of the Massif Central and is assigned a mid-Carboniferous age.

Like the already mentioned South Limousin Fault the entire Génis Unit underwent ductile, dextral wrenching and can thus be conceived as a fairly wide, upright, WNW-ESE-striking shear zone. Dextral shear criteria can be found in all of its formations. Asymmetrically deformed quartz pebbles in conglomeratic layers of the Thiviers sandstone indicate dextral shearing. The same sense of movement is even more evident in the Génis porphyroid, where pressure shadows have formed around the quartz and alkali feldspar phenocrysts. Millimetre-sized shear bands within the Génis sericite schist also point at dextral shearing.

The timing of the shearing motions is based on comparisons with similar terrains in the Armorican Massif (Chantonnay synform in the Vendée) and in the Rouergue. The dextral shearing in the Armorican Massif is dated as Namurian and Westphalian (Serpukhovian till Moscovian), i.e. 325 to 305 million years ago. It is therefore reasonable to assume a mid- to late Carboniferous age for the deformations in the Génis Unit of the southern Limousin.

The pervasive shearing motions are also responsible for the fold structures in the Génis Unit, which can be interpreted as tear folds caused by the transpressive, ductile wrenching.

== Sources ==
- BRGM. Feuille Juillac. Carte géologique de la France à 1/50 000
- Peterlongo, J.M. (1978). Massif Central. Guides Géologiques Régionaux. Masson. ISBN 2-225-49753-2
- Roig, J.-Y., Faure, M. & Ledru, P. (1996). Polyphase wrench tectonics in the southern French Massif Central: kinematic inferences from pre- and syntectonic granitoids. Geologische Rundschau, 85, pp. 138–153
