= René Rimbert =

French painter

René Rimbert (September 19, 1896 – March 23, 1991) was a French painter. His work is often associated with Naïve art but has influences from Neorealism, Post- and Neo-Impressionism and Dutch Golden Age painting.

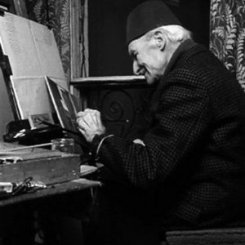
Rimbert René

== Early life ==
Rimbert was born in Paris. His father was a gilder and picture framer. He grew up in the Montparnasse - Saint-Germain-des-Prés district of Paris. As a child and teenager he was involved in music, drawing and painting and reading. His father encouraged him to enter the French Postal administration. The young postal clerk continued to pursue his artistic interests until World War I, when he was enlisted and joined the general military staff, first as a telegraph operator and then as a draughtsman. When the war ended he went back to the Postal Administration, got married and started his two-track career as a postal officer and an artist.

== Career ==
Rimbert's career as a painter began in 1920. From 1932 until 1944 his painting was interrupted, first by illness and later by World War II. He then continued to paint until 1983.

In addition to numerous drawings, unfinished or destroyed paintings, his work consists of 276 recorded paintings, mainly oil on canvas, which are now in the possession of private collectors and museums in France and in other countries.

Rimbert's paintings were influenced by the Dutch classic master painters, by the French 18th-century painter Jean-Baptiste-Siméon Chardin, and by Henri Rousseau (Le Douanier Rousseau), who was starting to be recognized at the time when Rimbert began painting. One of Rimbert's early works, "Le douanier Rousseau heading for glory and prosperity" is dedicated to Rousseau.

Rimbert's friend, French painter Marcel Gromaire, convinced him to exhibit some of his early works. Two years later he met the poet and painter Max Jacob, who introduced Rimbert to well-known artists, including Pablo Picasso, Georges Braque, and Amedeo Modigliani. The ongoing exchanges of letters between these two men have been published. He also met the art critic Anatole Jakovsky, who gave Rimbert's paintings the label of "naïve Art".

Rimbert's earliest paintings are mainly still lifes, but soon he began to paint representations of quaint buildings and street scenes in his native Paris, its suburbs and in provincial towns as well as landscapes. The village and surrounding countryside of Perpezac-le-Noir, near Brive-La-Gaillarde in southwestern France, where his wife's family came from and where she owned a house, is also often represented. His later works reflect his visits during winter on the Côte d'Azur and often depict Mediterranean street scenes and landscapes.

== Exhibitions ==
Rimbert exhibited at the Salon des Indépendants, the salon des surindépendants, the Salon d'Automne, the salon "Comparaisons" as well as at numerous group shows in France, and in other countries, of "Maîtres populaires", "Peintres naïfs", or "Primitifs”.

Rimbert also had nine solo exhibitions in Paris between 1927 and 1987, as well as a posthumous exhibition in 1996. In 2007 a major exhibition of his works was held at the Musée International d'Art Naïf Anatole Jakovsky, in Nice, establishing a parallel between Rimbert and Marcel Gromaire.

== Selected books about his art ==
- Drago Zdunic, Primitive Painting, Fine Arts Books, New York, 1981.
- Marie-Christine Hugonot, Guide naïf de Paris: Paris through the eyes of the modern primitives. Publisher: Hervas, 1983.
- Pierre Guénégan, Dina Vierny, Bertrand Lorguin, Marie-Christine Hugonot, Thomas Michael Gunter, Rimbert. Publisher: Dina Vierny, Paris, 1983.
- Pierre Guénégan, René Rimbert. Annotated catalogue of paintings. Publisher: Lanwell & Leeds, Geneva, 2005.
- Musée International d'Art Naïf Anatole Jakovsky, René Rimbert - Marcel Gromaire. Nice 2007

Films:

- "Rimbert" by Levanier, 1982
- "René Rimbert" by Noël Mamére - Pierre Guenégan, 1984
