= Orgnac =

Orgnac is part of the name of several communes in France:

- Orgnac-l'Aven, a commune in the Ardèche department
- Orgnac-sur-Vézère, a commune in the Corrèze department
