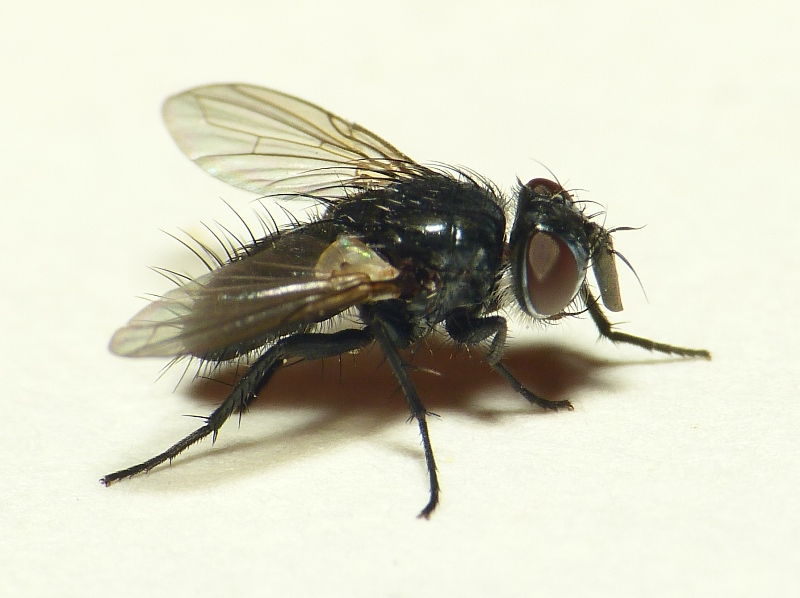
- Ligeria angusticornis

Scientific classification
- Kingdom: Animalia
- Phylum: Arthropoda
- Class: Insecta
- Order: Diptera
- Family: Tachinidae
- Subfamily: Exoristinae
- Tribe: Blondeliini
- Genus: Ligeria
- Species: L. angusticornis

Binomial name
- Ligeria angusticornis (Loew, 1847)

Synonyms
- Anachaetopsis zetterstedti Ringdahl, 1945; Brachycoelia ocypterina Meade, 1892; Ligeria angustifrons Herting, 1960; Ligeria ocypterina (Meade, 1892); Ligeria zetterstedti (Ringdahl, 1945); Scopolia angusticornis Loew, 1847

= Ligeria angusticornis =

Species of fly

Ligeria angusticornis is a European species of fly in the family Tachinidae.
