= Geology of the Massif Central =

The Massif Central is one of the two large basement massifs in France, the other being the Armorican Massif. The Massif Central's geological evolution started in the late Neoproterozoic and continues to this day. It has been shaped mainly by the Caledonian orogeny and the Variscan orogeny. The Alpine orogeny has also left its imprints, probably causing the important Cenozoic volcanism. The Massif Central has a very long geological history, underlined by zircon ages dating back into the Archaean 3 billion years ago. Structurally it consists mainly of stacked metamorphic basement nappes.

== Introduction ==
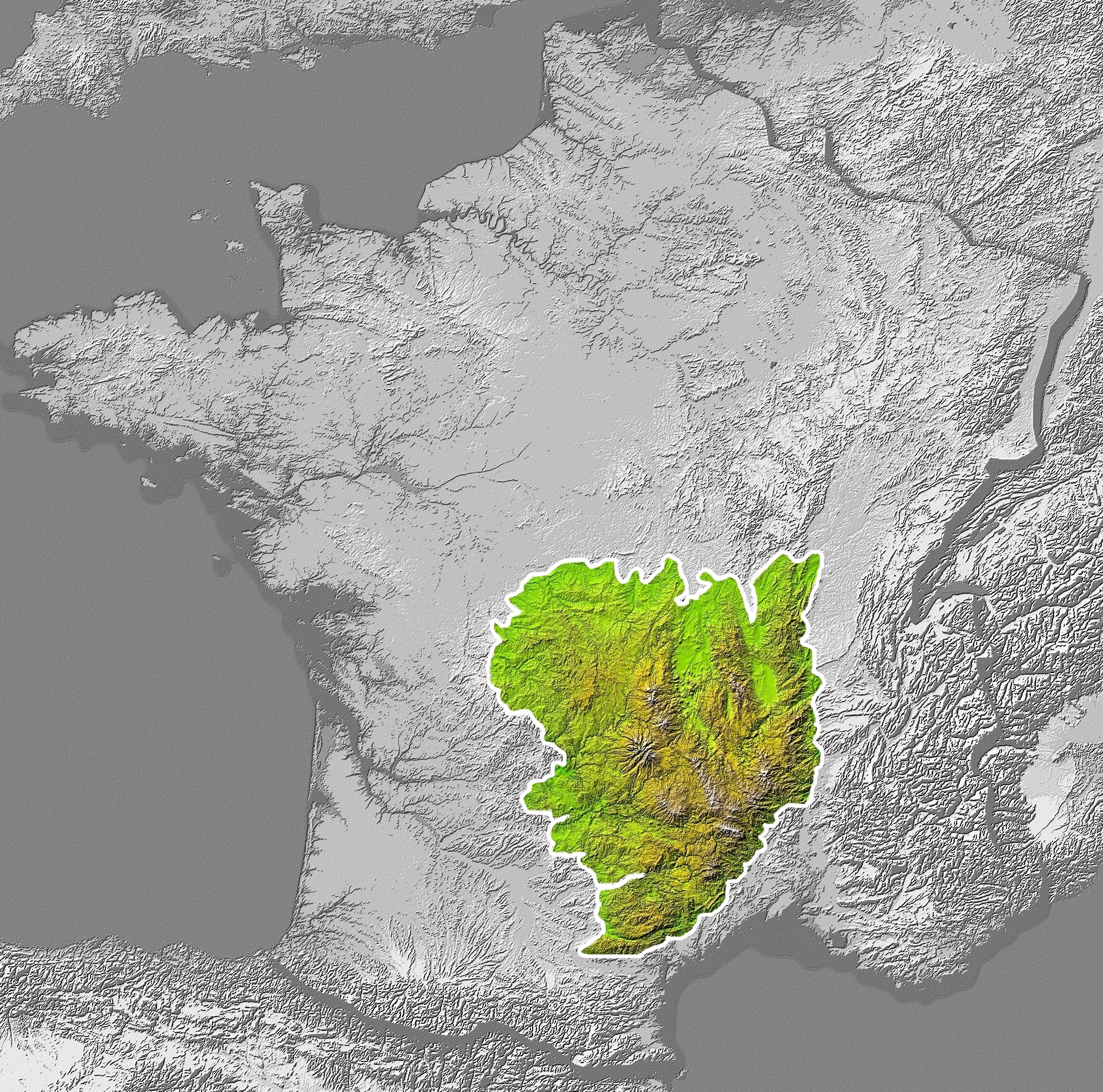
Geographical position of the Massif Central in France.

The basement outcrops of the Massif Central have roughly the outline of a triangle standing on its tip. Because of its size – 500 kilometers long and 340 kilometers wide – the Massif Central partakes in several tectono-metamorphic zones formed during the Variscan orogeny. The bulk of the massif belongs to the Ligero-Arvernian Zone, sometimes also called the microcontinent Ligeria. With its northeastern tip, the Morvan, it reaches into the Morvano-Vosgian Zone which becomes the Moldanubian Zone farther east. All these zones constitute the interior core of the Variscan orogen in Europe which is characterized by the following traits:

- It contains remnants of oceanic crust that were subducted during the Silurian and the Devonian.
- The approach of Gondwana from the South onto the cadomian microcontinent Armorica (and farther east onto the Saxothuringian Mid-German Crystalline Rise) induced a continental collision slicing the basement into several large-scale nappes and thrusting them into southerly directions.
- After the thrusting the orogen was exhumed diachronously. Exhumation started in the western and northern Massif Central already in the Upper Devonian (Frasnian) 380 million years ago whereas the southern part was elevated much later (in the Tournaisian, 350 MA BP). The Vosges farther east were raised even later – at the end of the Viséan at 330 MA BP.

In the far south the Massif Central forms part of the Montagne Noire Zone. This zone constitutes together with the Pyrenees the microcontinent Aquitania; it is no longer made up of basement nappes, but contains low-grade Paleozoic sedimentary nappes having gravitationally slid off to the south from the rising Neoproterozoic basement.

== Geography ==
The Massif Central is crossed by major fault zones dividing it into several spatial domains.

The most important fault line is probably the NNE-SSW-striking Sillon Houiller, a 250 kilometer long normal fault with a strong sinistral wrenching component. The Sillon Houiller separates the nonvolcanic western section from the volcanic central and eastern section. Farther south it becomes the Toulouse fault.

The Oligocene Limagne graben penetrates nearly 150 kilometers into the Massiv Central from the North and almost manages to cut through towards the Grands Causses.

The narrow central section west of this graben system carries stratovolcanoes like the Cantal – Europe's highest shield volcano – and the Monts Dore (including the highest elevation in the massif, the Puy de Sancy), but also maar and explosion craters of the Chaîne des Puys farther north.

The eastern section extends from the Morvan in the Northeast to the Cévennes in the South. It is bounded in the East by the Bresse graben and its extension into the Bas Dauphiné. The change in altitude towards the grabens is quite drastic. The graben structures along the southeastern edge already form part of the oceanic Liguro-Provençal Basin. The eastern section is further subdivided by the Roanne graben and its southern continuation the Plaine du Forez. It is also cut by the NE-trending Permian strike-slip basin of Blanzy – Le Creusot which separates the Morvan from the main massif.

An important ESE-WNW-striking division is situated near Figeac and Decazeville separating the Rouergue and the Montagne Noire in the South almost completely from the main basement outcrops.

In general the Massif Central is an asymmetric basement plate elevated at its southern margin by the Pyrenees orogeny and along its eastern margin by the Alpine orogeny. Along these margins it descends very abruptly to the surrounding grabens. These margins also show the highest elevations, the plate being gently inclined to the Northwest where the basement rocks disappear under the Mesozoic cover of the Aquitaine basin and the Paris Basin. This somewhat simplistic model is locally disturbed by fault lines and graben structures – for instance the massif's highest elevation is positioned in the central section (Puy de Sancy culminating at 1886 meters) as already mentioned.

== Tectono-metamorphic domains ==
The crystalline basement rocks of the Massif Central (mainly gneisses and metamorphic schists) have been divided by M. Chenevoy (1974) into three tectono-metamorphic domains:

- the Arverne domain (Auvergne)
- the Ruteno-Limousin domain (Rouergue – Limousin)
- the Cevenole domain (Cévennes)

=== The Arverne domain ===
Position of the Massif Central within the Variscan orogen in Europe

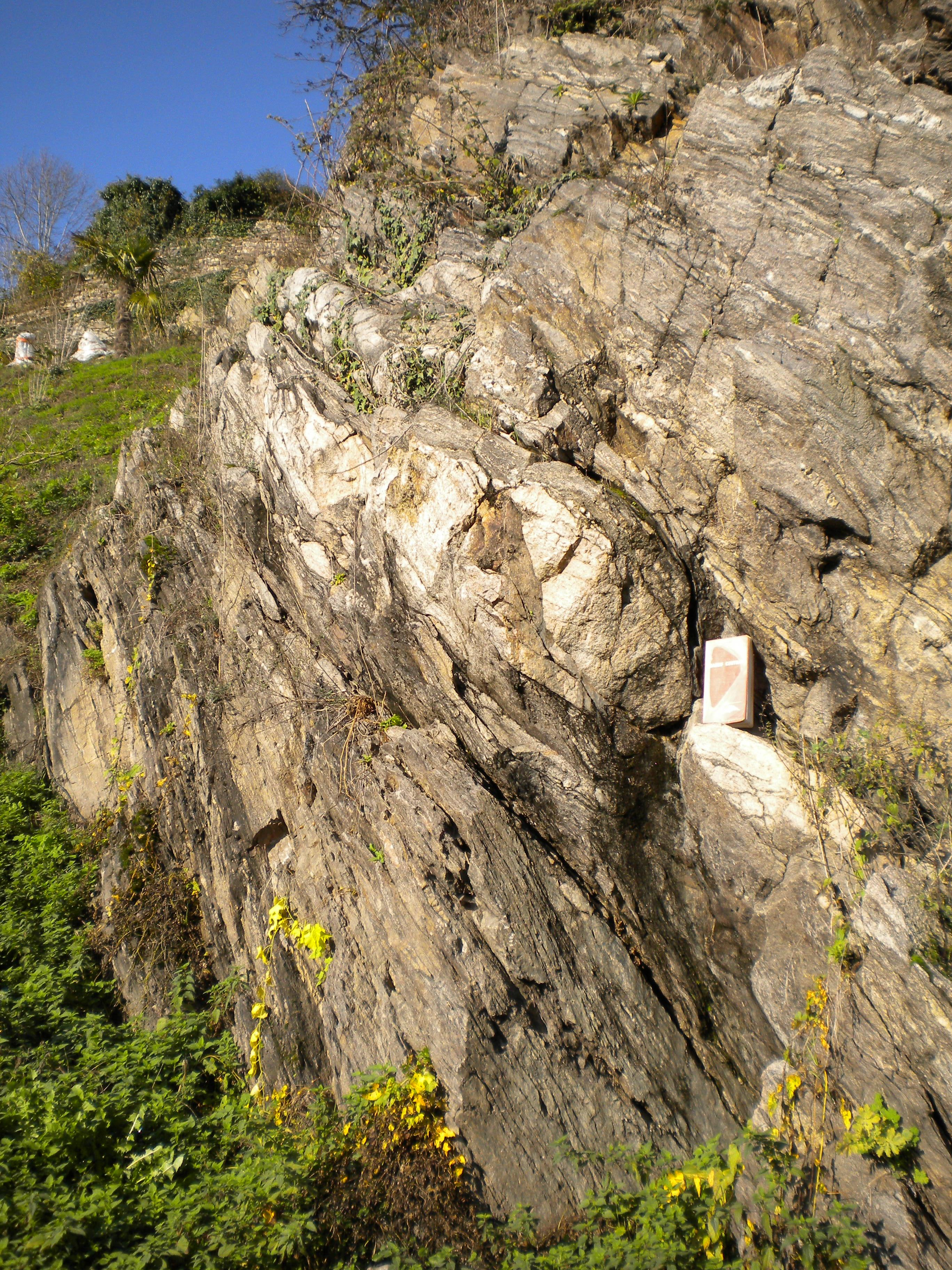
Neoproterozoic paragneis of the Arverne domain near Nontron, Dordogne. The light-coloured graywacke layer is boudinaged and dips steeply to the NNE.

The Arverne domain is structurally the lowermost domain with parautochthonous character. It surrounds basement highs like the Saint-Mathieu dome, the Sussac dome or the enormous Plateau de Millevaches. All these tectonic windows into the lower basement are situated in the nonvolcanic western section. More continuous outcrops of the Arverne domain can be found in the Auvergne (thence the name), the western Marche, the northern Morvan, the Lyonnais and the Livradois (Haut-Allier).

The now high-grade metamorphic rocks – essentially the amphibolite facies with medium-pressure high-temperature conditions was reached - were originally deposited as flysch sequences along Gondwanas northern continental slope. This flysch sequence consisted of monotonous, rhythmically interbedded clayey (pelites) and sandy (greywackes) deposits reaching the astonishing thickness of 15 kilometers in places. Its middle section contains bimodal volcanic deposits with a thickness of several thousand meters. Material of rhyolitic composition prevails, but tholeiitic basalts, rare peridotites and carbonate lenses do also occur. This Neoproterozoic sequence originally was estimated to be 650 million years old, its age though has recently been reduced to 600 – 550 million years BP (Ediacaran).

The sediments of the Arverne domain were metamorphosed mainly during the Acadian phase of the Caledonian orogeny about 400 – 350 million years ago. Pressures reached 0,6 – 0,8 GPa according to a burial depth of about 20 – 25 kilometers, the temperature gradient being 20 – 25 °C per kilometer. The original sedimentary succession transformed into migmatites at its base, followed by gneisses, micaschists and finally sericite schists and chlorite schists at the top, the schists at the top only being metamorphosed under greenschist facies conditions. The volcanogenic material was metamorphosed to leptynites and amphibolites.

Included in this metamorphic succession are also augengneisses that originated from sheared orthogneisses, which in turn represent porphyric granitoids dated around 500 MA BP (Furongian).

=== Ruteno-Limousin domain ===
The metamorphic rocks of the Ruteno-Limousin domain are only encountered in the Limousin, the Rouergue, the eastern Marche, the Châtaigneraie, the southern Margeride and in the western parts of the Cévennes. The once sedimentary succession starts off like in the Arverne domain but comprises also a Paleozoic sequence at its top. The Paleozoic begins in the Lower Cambrian with a thick volcanogenic series of rhyolitic composition. This is followed by dated Upper Cambrian, Ordovician and Silurian.

In the Limousin the Ruteno-Limousin domain underwent like the Arverne domain solely the Acadian phase metamorphism. In the Rouergue though this was overprinted by hercynian metamorphism that developed under LP/HT conditions.

=== Cevenole domain ===
The Cevenole domain includes the Cévennes, the Montagne Noire, the Monts d'Albi and the Lyonnais. Basal crystalline schists of the Arverne Domain are followed by a well-dated Paleozoic (Cambrian and Ordovician). In the Montagne Noire in the very South this Paleozoic series completely escaped any metamorphic transformations and reaches right up to the Mississippian, but farther north in the Albigeois and in the Cévennes it progressively takes up hercynian metamorphism.

To summarize: all three domains share the basal Neoproterozoic succession (or at least parts of it). They differ in the Paleozoic part: the Arverne domain for example is completely devoid of Paleozoic rocks. The Arverne domain reaches structurally deepest, its Neoproterozoic goes right down to basal migmatites. The Cevenole domain, in contrast, is much more superficial, its Neoproterozoic comprises only structurally higher schists and in the Montagne Noire even a completely nonmetamorphic Paleozoic. The Ruteno-Limousin domain takes on an intermediary position.

== Low-grade metamorphic sequences ==
Low-grade greenschist facies rocks are underrepresented in the Massif Central and mainly occur along the periphery. Examples are the Génis Unit, the Thiviers-Payzac unit in the Bas Limousin, the Mazerolles Schists in the Haute Charente, the Brévenne Unit in the Lyonnais in the Northeast and the schists of the Albigeois in the South.

The Génis Unit for example shows the following succession (from young to old):

- Génis Greenschist
- Upper Silurian conodont-bearing limestone lenses
- Génis Sericite Schist containing Ordovician acritarchs
- silicified arkoses of Moulin du Guimalet, showing a possible affinity to the Ordovician Grès armoricain from Brittany
- Génis Porphyroids, metaignimbrites from the Cambrian/Ordovician boundary
- Excideuil Sericite Schist, probably Cambrian

The Thiviers-Payzac Unit consists mainly of rhyodacitic tuffs, greywackes and siltstones. Their metamorphic degree can reach the amphibolite facies.

The Mazerolles Schists are aluminous micaschists with interbedded quartzitic layers. They derive from pelites and siltstones and are probably Cambrian in age.

The Brévenne Unit is an ophiolitic nappe of Upper Devonian age. It comprises pillow basalts, dolerites, gabbros, ultramafic rocks, cherts and massive sulfides.

== Sedimentary evolution ==
Nonmetamorphic sedimentary successions are very important for paleogeographic reconstructions, because they represent the paleoenvironmental settings in an unaltered or only slightly altered fashion. In the Massif central suitable successions are highly underrepresented with their main outcrops occurring along the periphery. This fact explains the difficulty in reconstructing the massif's evolution in a coherent way.

=== Precarboniferous deposits ===
Precarboniferous nonmetamorphic sequences can be found in two major areas:

- in the Montagne Noire at the southern edge of the massif
- in the Morvan in the northeast

The southern edge of the Montagne Noire possesses a nearly complete sedimentary succession from the Cambrian right up to the Mississippian.

The Cambrian starts with basal rhyolites, followed by the Grès de Marcory, a sandstone formation, by archaeocyathid-bearing limestones, shales and more sandstones. The Ordovician and the Silurian consist mainly of shales, whereas the Devonian is made up exclusively of carbonates in Mediterranean facies.

Along the northern side of the Montagne Noire the series is more incomplete, the entire Upper Ordovician is missing. As a recompense one can study here the gradual changeover of the nonmetamorphic Cambro-Silurian system into the metamorphic equivalents of the Albigeois.

In the Morvan Devonian sediments of the Givetian, Frasnian and Famennian stages are exposed. Givetian and Frasnian are developed as reefal limestones. The Famennian is composed of clymeniid-bearing shales interbedded with spilites.

=== Mississippian ===
Mississippian sediments crop out in a band stretching from the Roannais via the Beaujolais to just southwest of Montluçon.

The series starts in the Lower Viséan with shaly to sandy sediments, followed by greywackes, conglomerates and carbonates in the Middle Viséan (the Tournaisian is generally missing in the Massif Central, exceptions being some scattered occurrences in the Morvan). Very important are the transgressing Tufs anthracifères in the Upper Viséan (dated between 335 and 330 MA BP). They consist of pyroclastic tuffs with rhyolitic or dacitic composition, cover a large area and reach large thicknesses. The name is derived from occasional interbedded anthracite layers that indicate a paralic environment near a shallow sea.

=== Coal-bearing Pennsylvanian ===
After the strong tectonic movements during the period 325 – 305 MA BP (Serpukhovian, Bashkirian and Moscovian – Sudeten Phase and Asturian Phase) accompanied by extensive granitisation the young orogen underwent late orogenic extension in the Kasimovian. As a consequence narrow fault-bounded graben-like depressions formed that were filled with lake sediments (conglomerates, sandstones, shales interbedded with layers rich in organic material that later transformed into coal seams). Sometimes rhyolitic intercalations do occur.

Examples are the relatively small coal-bearing basins near Ahun, Argentat, Blanzy, Decazeville, Graissessac, Le Creusot, Messeix within the Sillon Houiller, Saint-Étienne, Sainte-Foy and Sincey-lès-Rouvray.

Later during the Saalian Phase the sedimentary infill of these basins was strongly folded due to wrenching movements in the adjacent basement blocks.

=== Permian basins ===
The orogenic stretching continued also during the Permian and more basins were formed, mainly along the periphery of the massif. The detrital sedimentary infill consisted mainly of continental red desert sandstones, siltstones and shales.

Examples are the basins near Autun, Blanzy, Brive, Espalion, Moulins and Saint-Affrique.

=== Mesozoic ===
During the Mesozoic the Massif Central stayed above sea-level, yet the severe erosional processes attacking it since the end of the Carboniferous continued unabatedly and gradually leveled the former mountain range into a peneplain. Along its edges and especially in the Southeast the Jurassic sea deposited thick limestone sequences that later became the Causses.

=== Cenozoic ===
At the beginning of the Cenozoic the Massif Central started to feel the effects of the pyrenean and the alpine orogeny, especially along its southern and eastern edges that were uplifted quite drastically. The consequences of these strong stresses on the crust initiated explosive volcanism already during the Paleocene. The volcanic activities have continued since then practically up to this day.

During the Late Eocene the so-called Sidérolithique was deposited. This is an iron-rich sediment resembling laterites and indicating extensive erosion of the massif (after its renewed uplift) under subtropical climatic conditions.

In the Middle Eocene (Lutetian) a new distensional period started that reached its climax during the Oligocene. The stretching of the crust caused extensional grabens to form. Examples are the roughly N-S- to NNW-SSE-striking asymmetric graben structures of the Bresse, Cher, Limagne, Plaine du Forez and the Roanne graben. These depressions were again filled with lake sediments with occasional volcanic intercalations, the so-called peperites. The sediments can reach considerable thicknesses e.g. 2500 meter in the Limagne.

Towards the end of the Miocene the precursors of the great stratovolcanoes Cantal and Monts Dore started to form. In the eastern Velay thick alkaline basalts extruded and phonolitic plugs pushed up.

During the Pliocene a new period of strong uplift began that led to increased erosion and triggered very strong volcanism. In fact the Massif Central experienced its climax in volcanic activities at this time - the Cantal stratovolcano for example started to build up to elevations over 3000 meters.

The last ice age saw valley glaciers and small ice caps establishing themselves on the Cantal and on the Monts Dore, as is demonstrated by moraines and cirques.

The last phreatomagmatic explosions happened in the Chaîne des Puys only 3000 to 4000 years ago.

== Meteorite impact ==
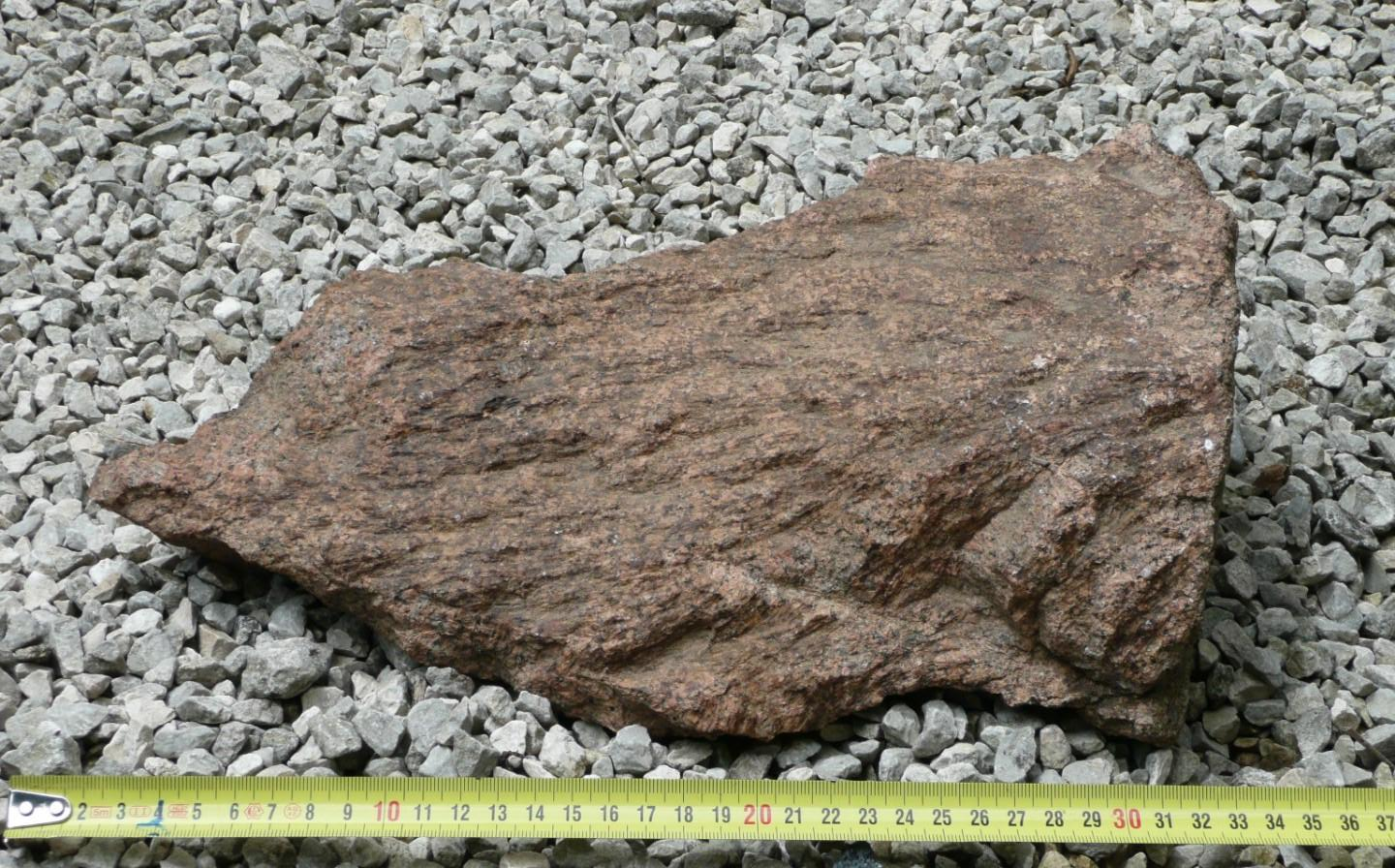
Shatter cone from the Rochechouart impact structure

The northwestern edge of the Massif Central near Rochechouart was struck during the latest Triassic Period (Rhaetian Stage) (about 202 million years ago) by a large meteorite, probably of the stony-iron type. The impact excavated a crater with a diameter of 20 kilometers in the peneplained basement rocks. Today the crater structure is almost completely eroded away, yet some suevites, several impact breccias, planar deformation features (PDFs), shatter cones and many local thrusts in the basement still document this event.

== Tectonics ==
=== Structural organisation ===
Structurally the Massif Central consists of stacked metamorphic basement nappes that have been overthrust onto their southern foreland (Aquitania). The following structural units can be discerned (from structurally higher to structurally lower):

- Low-grade to non-metamorphic units. Usually they overlie the Upper Gneiss Unit with a thrust contact. An exception are the discordantly overlying tufs anthracifères.
- Upper Gneiss Unit(UGU). Carries eclogite and granulite remnants at its base, followed by the leptyno-amphibolitic complex and a thick anatexite-bearing paragneiss sequence. This unit has experienced the strongest metamorphism. The Upper Gneiss Unit is separated from the underlying Lower Gneiss Unit by mylonites.
- Lower Gneiss Unit (LGU). Consists mainly of a succession of metamorphosed greywackes, pelites and rhyolites with interlayered orthogneisses (augengneisses) that originated from alkaline granitoids. The granitoids intruded the country rocks in the interval 540 – 430 MA BP. The Lower Gneiss Unit overthrusts the Parautochthonous Micaschist Unit.
- Parautochthonous Micaschist Unit (PMU). Mainly micaschists, but also minor quartzites, occasional amphibolites and carbonate lenses. The metamorphic grade is greenschist facies to epidote amphibolite facies. The PMU overthrusts the fold and thrust belt to the South.
- Paleozoic fold and thrust belt. This unit is very well developed in the Montagne Noire. It shows kilometer-scale isoclinal recumbent folding with thrusting to the South. It comprises a low-grade to non-metamorphic sedimentary sequence ranging from the Lower Cambrian to the Mississippian.
- Foreland basin. This basin reaches from the southeastern Montagne Noire to the Pyrenees and is filled with Viséan and Serpukhovian turbidites. Its proximal facies in the Montagne Noire carries olistholiths from the fold and thrust belt.

=== Geodynamic evolution ===
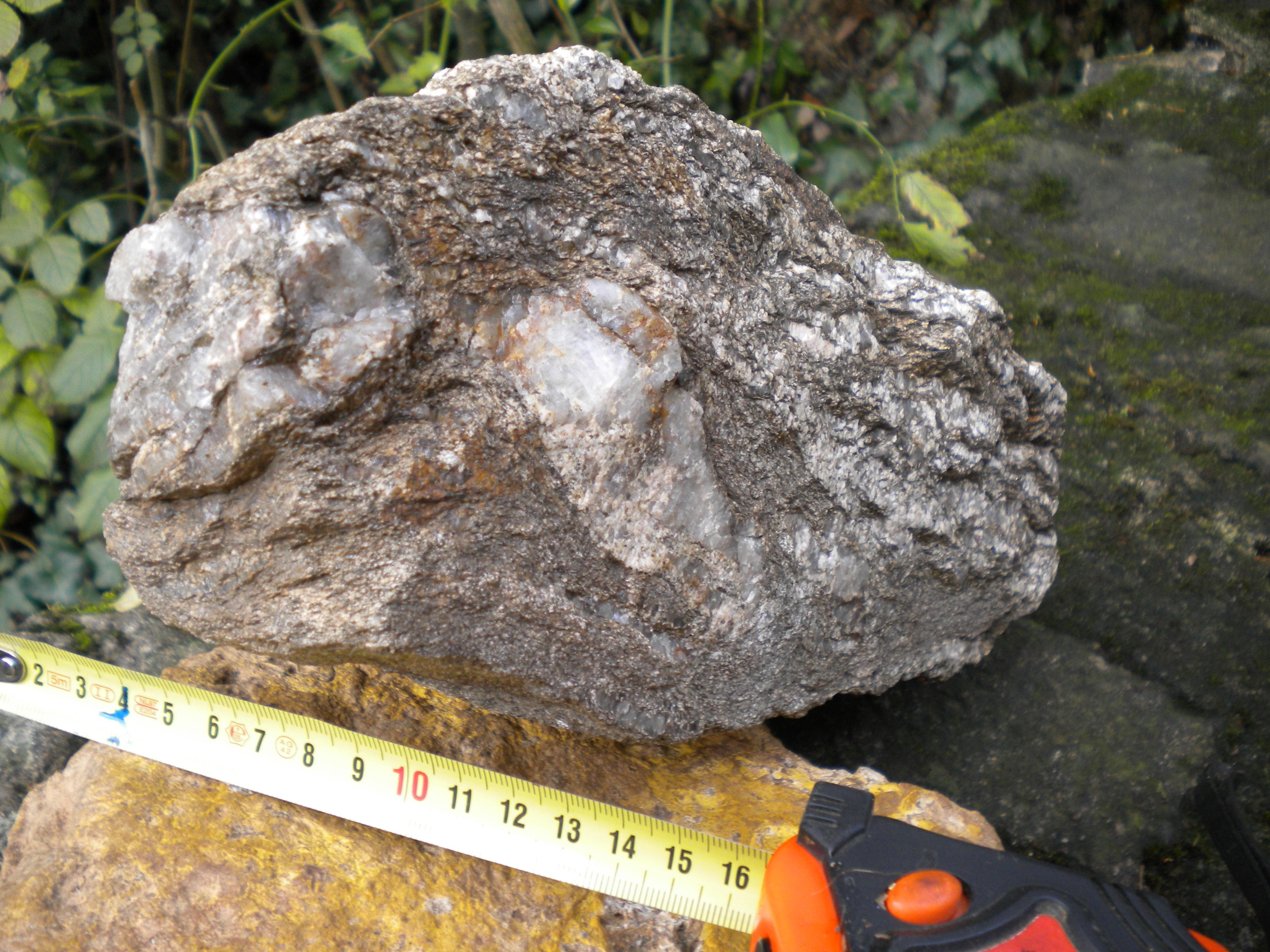
Paragneiss from the Arverne domain. This sample demonstrates the structural complexity found in the Massif Central. The left hand side shows a porphyroblast in C/S attitude with sense of movement top to the Southwest (D_{1}-Phase). The right hand side also shows a porphyroblast in C/S attitude but with sense of movement top to the Northwest (D_{2}-phase). The layers above it glide off to the right producing southeast-vergent small-scale folding (D_{4}-phase)

Geodynamically the Massif Central can be subdivided into six major deformational phases, according to Faure et al. (2008):

- Phase D_{0}. Synchronous with end-Silurian HP (high pressure) to UHP metamorphism recorded only in eclogites and granulitic orthogneisses of the Upper Gneiss Unit at about 415 MA BP. This phase can be correlated with the eovariscan (or Caledonian) Ardennian phase. Pressures reached 1.8 – 2.0 GPa equivalent to a burial depth of about 55 to 60 kilometers, temperatures ranged between 650 and 750 °C.
- Phase D_{1}. This corresponds with the already mentioned mediovariscan (or Caledonian) Acadian phase in the Lower Devonian, which left a profound imprint on the Massif Central. Great recumbent isoclinal folds with a pronounced flatlying foliation were produced in this phase. The fold limbs sheared off at the hinges and turned into thrust sheets. The basement was deeply sliced and two major thrust units started to develop: the Upper Gneiss Unit and the Lower Gneiss Unit.
  The movement sense of these basement nappes was top to the southwest. As a consequence of the collisional movements anatectic melts were generated between 385 and 380 MA BP and the country rocks were partially migmatised. The migmatites sometimes contain eclogite remnants that have been retromorphosed to amphibolites under pressures of 0.7 GPa and temperatures at 700 °C.
  In the North the Upper Gneiss Unit is unconformably overlain by undeformed Upper Devonian sediments. This shows that in this part of the Massif Central the tectono-metamorphic evolution had come to an end by 380 MA BP.
- Phase D_{2}. Bretonian phase from 360 to 350 MA BP (end of the Upper Devonian – Tournaisian). This phase caused ductile shearing with a top to the Northwest motion. The metamorphic conditions were MP/MT.
- Phase D_{3}. Sudeten phase. This phase was active during the Viséan at 345 – 325 MA BP. It initiated thrusting in the South of the Massif Central that affected the Parautochthonous Micaschist Unit and the fold and thrust belt. The sense of motion was top to the SSW. Yet in the North it manifested as synorogenic stretching exemplified by the explosive volcanism that deposited the Tufs anthracifères.
- Phase D_{4}. Neovariscan crustal extension during the Serpukhovian, Bashkirian and Moscovian at 325 – 305 MA BP. The stretching of the crust in a NW-SE direction caused the extensive emplacement of synkinematic leucogranites and monzogranites.
- Phase D_{5}. Asturian phase. Post-orogenic collapse at the end of the Carboniferous (Kasimovian). The stresses causing the stretching acted now in a NNE-SSW direction. They are responsible for the numerous coal-bearing graben structures.

== Paleogeography ==
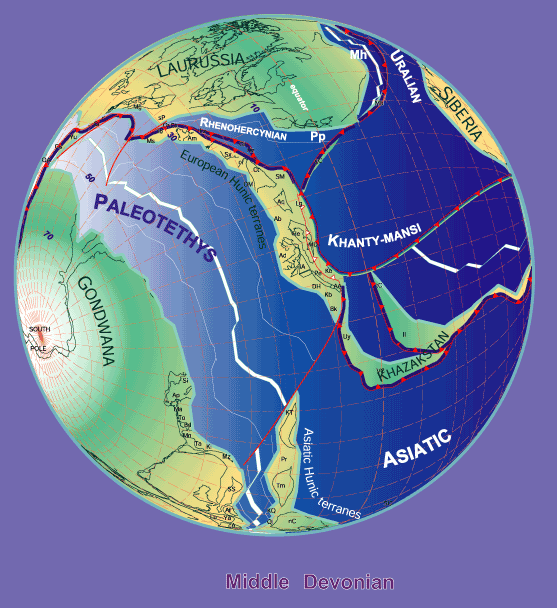
Paleogeographic reconstruction during the Middle Devonian. In this model the Massif Central (Lg) is part of the European Hun terrane

It seems now well established that at the end of the Neoproterozoic the Massif Central (i.e. the microcontinent Ligeria) and Armorica were part of Gondwana’s northern edge. At that time an extremely thick flysch sequence with interbedded bimodal volcanics was laid down in the adjoining ocean to the North. During the Lower Ordovician parts of Gondwanas northern rim started to break off and a sliver carrying Armorica and its eastern continuation - also called the Hun Superterrane – slowly started drifting northward. This opened up the Paleotethys in the wake. As a consequence the Rheic Ocean and the Rhenohercynian Ocean to the north were more and more constricted and eventually became subducted below Armorica or the Hun Superterrane. This subduction event corresponds in the Massif Central to the deformational phase D_{2}. The final continental collision during the Mississippian between Gondwana and Laurussia welded Ligeria into its actual position in the interior part of the Variscan orogen. The collision event is represented in the Massif Central by the phase D_{3}.

This is only a very sketchy paleogeographical reconstruction. Many models have been presented that usually differ in the sense of the subduction(s) and in the arrangements of the microcontinents. The common somewhat simplistic approach of orthogonal opening/closing can only be a first approximation, because the issue becomes much more complicated by trying to incorporate the very important dextral shearing motions affecting the Variscan orogen.

As an introduction into this subject see the paper by Stampfli et al. (2002).

== Concluding remarks ==
The Massif Central being a centerpiece of the Variscan orogen has undergone a rather complex geological evolution. Since its (diachronous) exhumation it has experienced very strong erosive peneplanation uncovering the polymetamorphic crystalline basement. Supracrustal sequences of sedimentary origin are strongly underrepresented and mainly occur along the periphery. Obviously this fact seriously hinders the reconstruction of the massif's geodynamic evolution.

A HP/UHP metamorphism caused by subduction at the Silurian/Devonian boundary was followed in the Devonian/Mississippian by polyphase dynamometamorphism due to crustal shortening. The latter developed a cross pattern in the resulting structures – the well known Variscan x. The intensive nappe-stacking during continental collision transported high-grade terranes in a southerly direction over less deformed units creating the impression of an inverted metamorphism – a feature so ubiquitous in the Massif Central. The last two deformational phases in the Pennsylvanian formed under extensional stresses and again produced a cross pattern in the resulting structures. The strong orogenic extension and final collapse triggered decompressional melting which led to pronounced granitisation and associated mineralisation mainly of the Au – Sb - W - type.

The structural cross pattern can also be found spatially. In the western and central section of the Massif Central NW-SE trending structures largely dominate, whereas in the eastern section a very strong NE-SW organisation prevails.

Of great importance is the diachronous evolution in the Massif Central. Thrusting and exhumation events migrated temporally and spatially. Thrusting for instance started in the North already at 385 MA BP and only reached the South (Montagne Noire) by 325 to 315 MA BP.

== Sources ==
- Éditions BRGM. (1996). Carte géologique de la France au millionième. Service Géologique National.
- Faure, Michel, Lardeaux, Jean-Marc und Ledru, Patrick (2008). A review of the pre-Permian geology of the Variscan French Massif Central. Les grands traits de l’évolution anté-permienne du Massif central français. Comptes Rendus Géoscience, Volume 341, numéro 2–3, pages 202-213 (Février 2009).
- Peterlongo, J. M. (1978). Massif Central. Guides géologiques régionaux. Masson. ISBN 2-225-49753-2
