= Ligeria latigena =

Scientific classification
- Kingdom: Animalia
- Phylum: Arthropoda
- Class: Insecta
- Order: Diptera
- Family: Tachinidae
- Subfamily: Exoristinae
- Tribe: Blondeliini
- Genus: Ligeria
- Species: L. latigena

Binomial name
- Ligeria latigena Wood, 1985

Species of fly

Ligeria latigena is a North America species of fly in the family Tachinidae.
