= Ugwu =

Ugu may refer to:

- Telfairia occidentalis, a plant native to Africa

== People with the surname ==
- Catherine Ugwu (born 1964), British executive producer, creative director, and consultant for ceremonies and large-scale events
- Chima Ugwu (born 1973), Nigerian shot-putter
- Gozie Ugwu (born 1993), English footballer
- Precious Ugwu (born 2006), Dutch footballer

== See also ==
- Ugu (disambiguation)
