= Troche =

- Commune
- Coat of arms
- Location of Troche
- Location within France Location within Nouvelle-Aquitaine
- Coordinates: 45°23′19″N 1°26′32″E
- Country: France
- Region: Nouvelle-Aquitaine
- Department: Corrèze
- Arrondissement: Brive-la-Gaillarde
- Canton: Allassac

Government
  - Mayor (2020–2026): Michel Audebert
- Area^{1}: 19.79 km^{2} (7.64 sq mi)
- Elevation: 409 m (1,342 ft)
- Highest elevation: 413 m (1,355 ft)
- Lowest elevation: 277 m (909 ft)
- Population (2023): 534
  - Density: 27.0/km^{2} (69.9/sq mi)
- Time zone: UTC+01:00 (CET)
  - Summer (DST): UTC+02:00 (CEST)
- INSEE/Postal code: 19270 /19230
- ^{1} French Land Register data, which excludes lakes, ponds, glaciers > 1 km^{2} (0.386 sq mi or 247 acres) and river estuaries.

Troche (French pronunciation: [tʁɔʃ]; Occitan: Trocha) is a commune in the Corrèze department in central France.

== Population ==
Historical population
Year	Pop.	±% p.a.
1968	683	—
1975	629	−1.17%
1982	558	−1.70%
1990	528	−0.69%
1999	486	−0.92%
2007	515	+0.73%
2012	548	+1.25%
2017	557	+0.33%
2023	534	−0.70%
Source: INSEE

== See also ==
- Communes of the Corrèze department
