= Saint-Bonnet-l'Enfantier =

- Commune
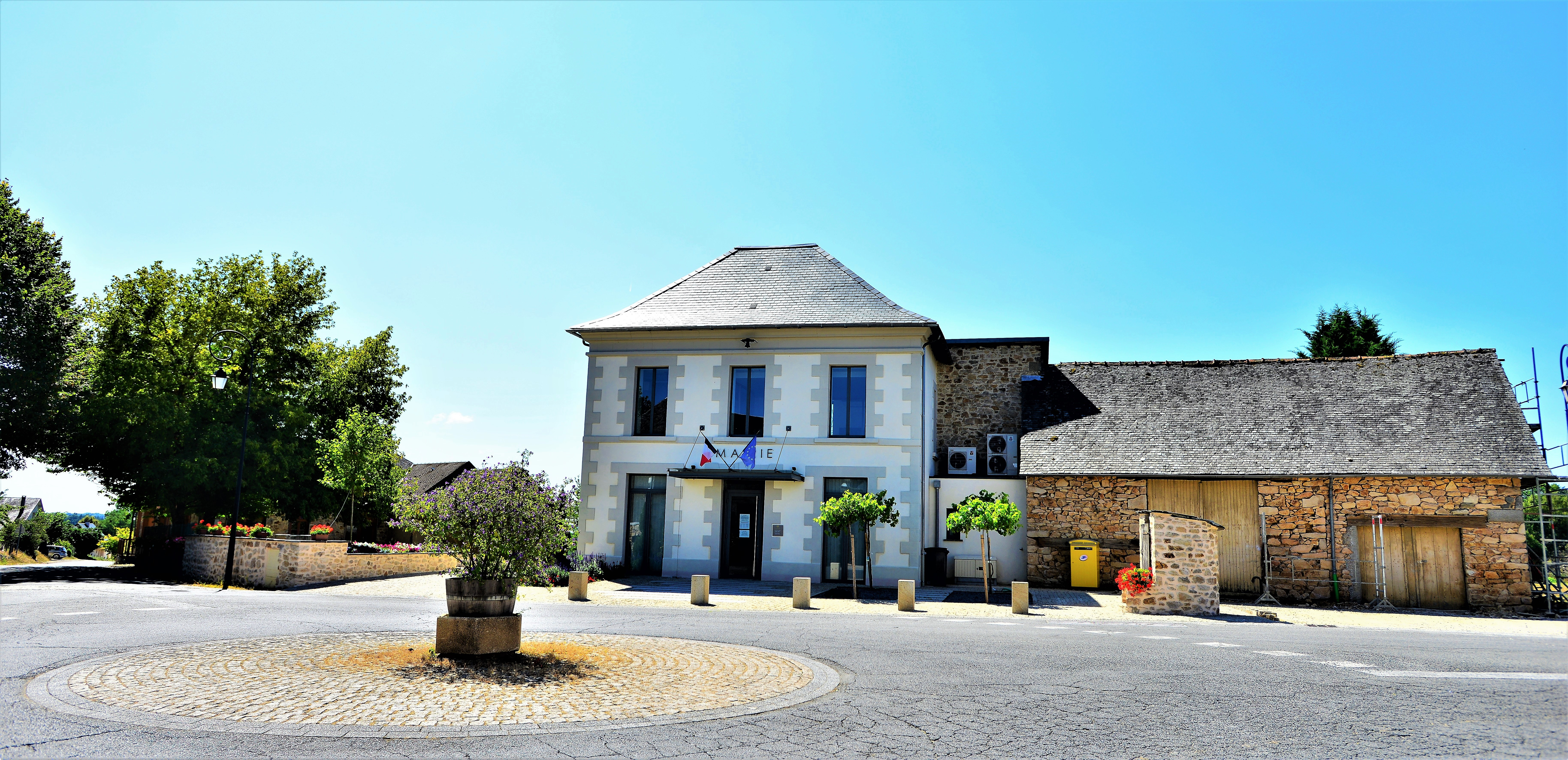
- Town hall

- Coat of arms
- Location of Saint-Bonnet-l'Enfantier
- Location within France Location within Nouvelle-Aquitaine
- Coordinates: 45°18′03″N 1°31′26″E
- Country: France
- Region: Nouvelle-Aquitaine
- Department: Corrèze
- Arrondissement: Brive-la-Gaillarde
- Canton: Allassac
- Intercommunality: CA Bassin de Brive

Government
  - Mayor (2020–2026): Didier Marsaleix
- Area^{1}: 11.78 km^{2} (4.55 sq mi)
- Elevation: 435 m (1,427 ft)
- Highest elevation: 435 m (1,427 ft)
- Lowest elevation: 283 m (928 ft)
- Population (2023): 410
  - Density: 35/km^{2} (90/sq mi)
- Time zone: UTC+01:00 (CET)
  - Summer (DST): UTC+02:00 (CEST)
- INSEE/Postal code: 19188 /19410
- ^{1} French Land Register data, which excludes lakes, ponds, glaciers > 1 km^{2} (0.386 sq mi or 247 acres) and river estuaries.

Saint-Bonnet-l'Enfantier (French pronunciation: [sɛ̃ bɔnɛ lɑ̃fɑ̃tje]; Limousin: Sent Bonet l’Enfantier) is a commune in the Corrèze department in central France.

== Population ==
Historical population
Year	Pop.	±% p.a.
1968	369	—
1975	306	−2.64%
1982	305	−0.05%
1990	270	−1.51%
1999	258	−0.50%
2007	319	+2.69%
2012	361	+2.50%
2017	400	+2.07%
2023	410	+0.41%
Source: INSEE

== See also ==
- Communes of the Corrèze department
