= Estivaux =

- Commune
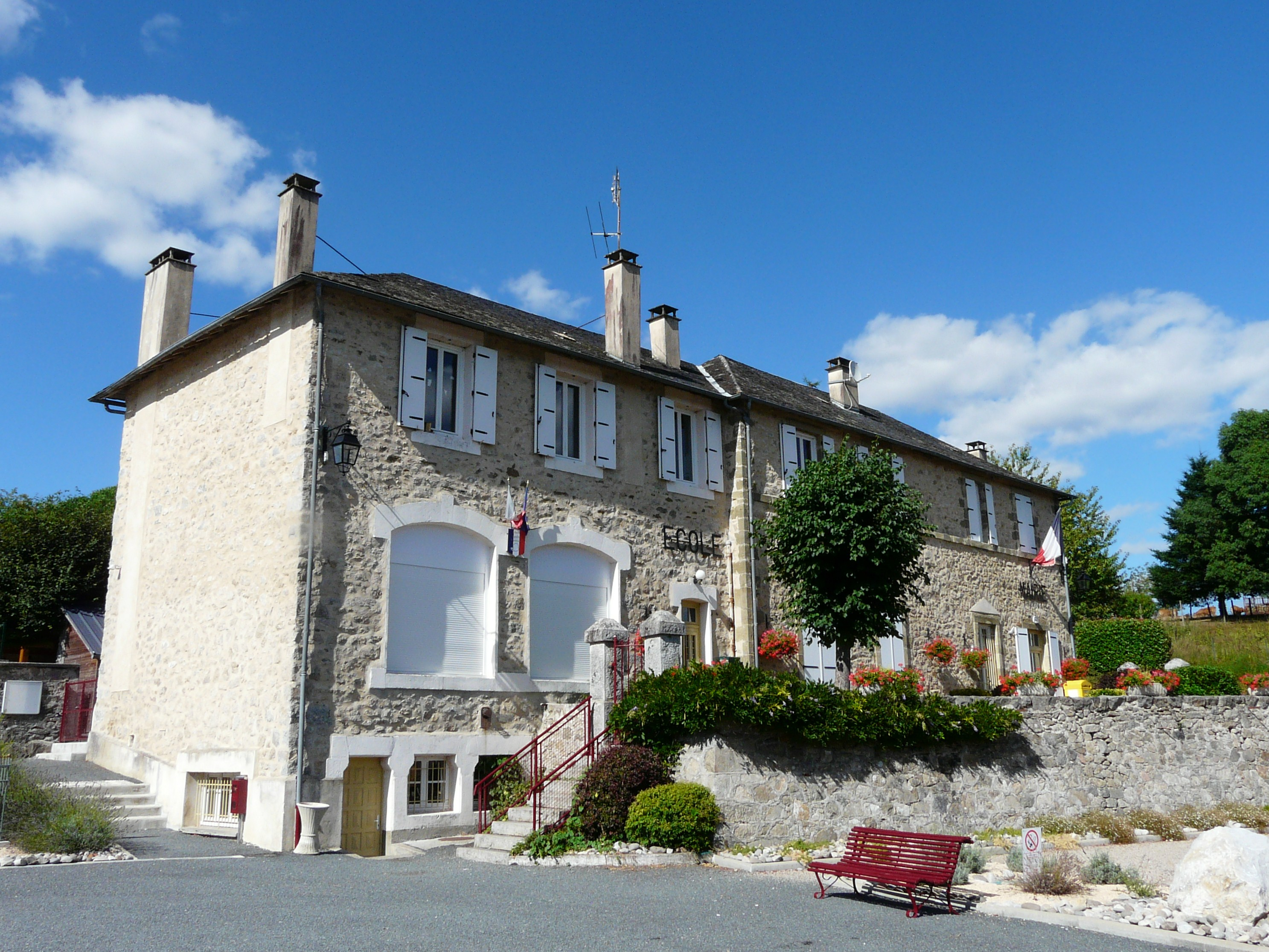
- Town hall

- Coat of arms
- Location of Estivaux
- Location within France Location within Nouvelle-Aquitaine
- Coordinates: 45°18′57″N 1°29′07″E
- Country: France
- Region: Nouvelle-Aquitaine
- Department: Corrèze
- Arrondissement: Brive-la-Gaillarde
- Canton: Allassac
- Intercommunality: CA Bassin de Brive

Government
  - Mayor (2020–2026): Carlos Martinez
- Area^{1}: 16.8 km^{2} (6.5 sq mi)
- Elevation: 330 m (1,080 ft)
- Highest elevation: 424 m (1,391 ft)
- Lowest elevation: 180 m (590 ft)
- Population (2023): 403
  - Density: 24.0/km^{2} (62.1/sq mi)
- Time zone: UTC+01:00 (CET)
  - Summer (DST): UTC+02:00 (CEST)
- INSEE/Postal code: 19078 /19410
- ^{1} French Land Register data, which excludes lakes, ponds, glaciers > 1 km^{2} (0.386 sq mi or 247 acres) and river estuaries.

Estivaux is a commune in the Corrèze department in central France.

Historical population
Year	Pop.	±% p.a.
1968	443	—
1975	378	−2.24%
1982	371	−0.27%
1990	340	−1.08%
1999	322	−0.60%
2007	373	+1.85%
2012	375	+0.11%
2017	434	+2.97%
2023	403	−1.23%
Source: INSEE

== See also ==
- Communes of the Corrèze department
