= Vigeois =

- Commune
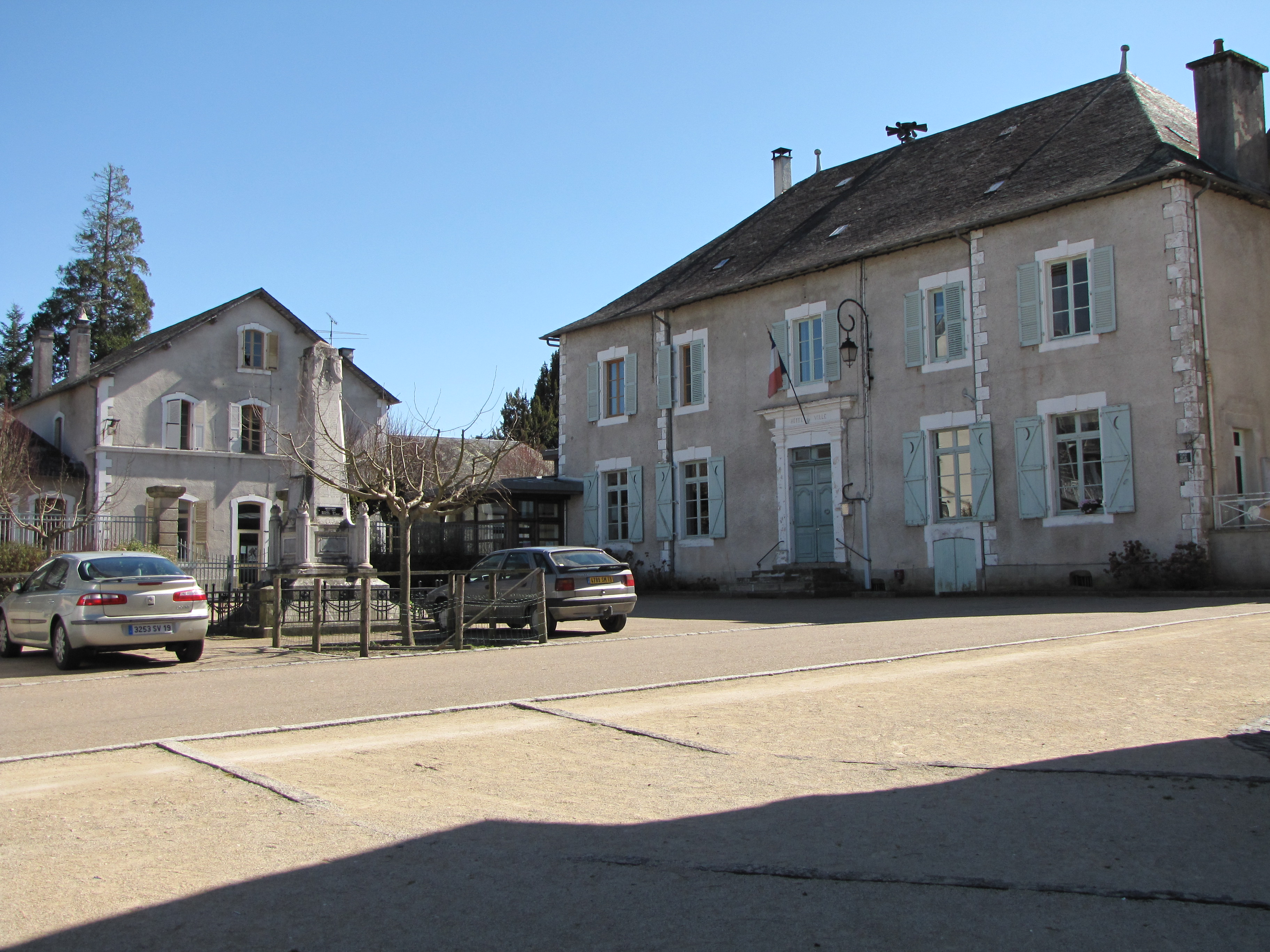
- Town hall

- Coat of arms
- Location of Vigeois
- Location within France Location within Nouvelle-Aquitaine
- Coordinates: 45°22′49″N 1°31′05″E
- Country: France
- Region: Nouvelle-Aquitaine
- Department: Corrèze
- Arrondissement: Tulle
- Canton: Allassac
- Intercommunality: Pays d'Uzerche

Government
  - Mayor (2020–2026): Jean-Paul Comby
- Area^{1}: 43.25 km^{2} (16.70 sq mi)
- Elevation: 335 m (1,099 ft)
- Highest elevation: 452 m (1,483 ft)
- Lowest elevation: 227 m (745 ft)
- Population (2023): 1,300
  - Density: 30/km^{2} (78/sq mi)
- Time zone: UTC+01:00 (CET)
  - Summer (DST): UTC+02:00 (CEST)
- INSEE/Postal code: 19285 /19410
- ^{1} French Land Register data, which excludes lakes, ponds, glaciers > 1 km^{2} (0.386 sq mi or 247 acres) and river estuaries.

Vigeois (French pronunciation: [viʒwa]; Occitan: Visoas) is a commune in the Corrèze department in central France. Vigeois station has rail connections to Brive-la-Gaillarde, Uzerche and Limoges.

== History ==
The village is first mentioned when a monastery was founded there by Aredius in 6th century. The late 9th century saw the Vikings sack the monastery. By 11th and 12th centuries, an abbey church had been constructed. During the Middle Ages, Vigeois was found in the lands of the Viscounts of Comborns. Elbes, Viscount of Comborn, chased away the Abbot Olderic's monks and killed its serfs, not long after the abbey had been consecrated by the Bishop of Limoges. To placate the church, he would distribute some of the abbey possession to other abbey's, the main beneficiary being the abbey at Uzerche. The village has an old bridge called the Pont des Anglaise, crossing the Vézère river, and was constructed during the 12th century.

== Population ==
Historical population
Year	Pop.	±% p.a.
1968	1,497	—
1975	1,346	−1.51%
1982	1,340	−0.06%
1990	1,210	−1.27%
1999	1,191	−0.18%
2007	1,115	−0.82%
2012	1,243	+2.20%
2017	1,195	−0.78%
2023	1,300	+1.41%
Source: INSEE

== Notable residents ==
- Henri Cueco, painter.

== See also ==
- Communes of the Corrèze department
