= Donzenac =

- Commune
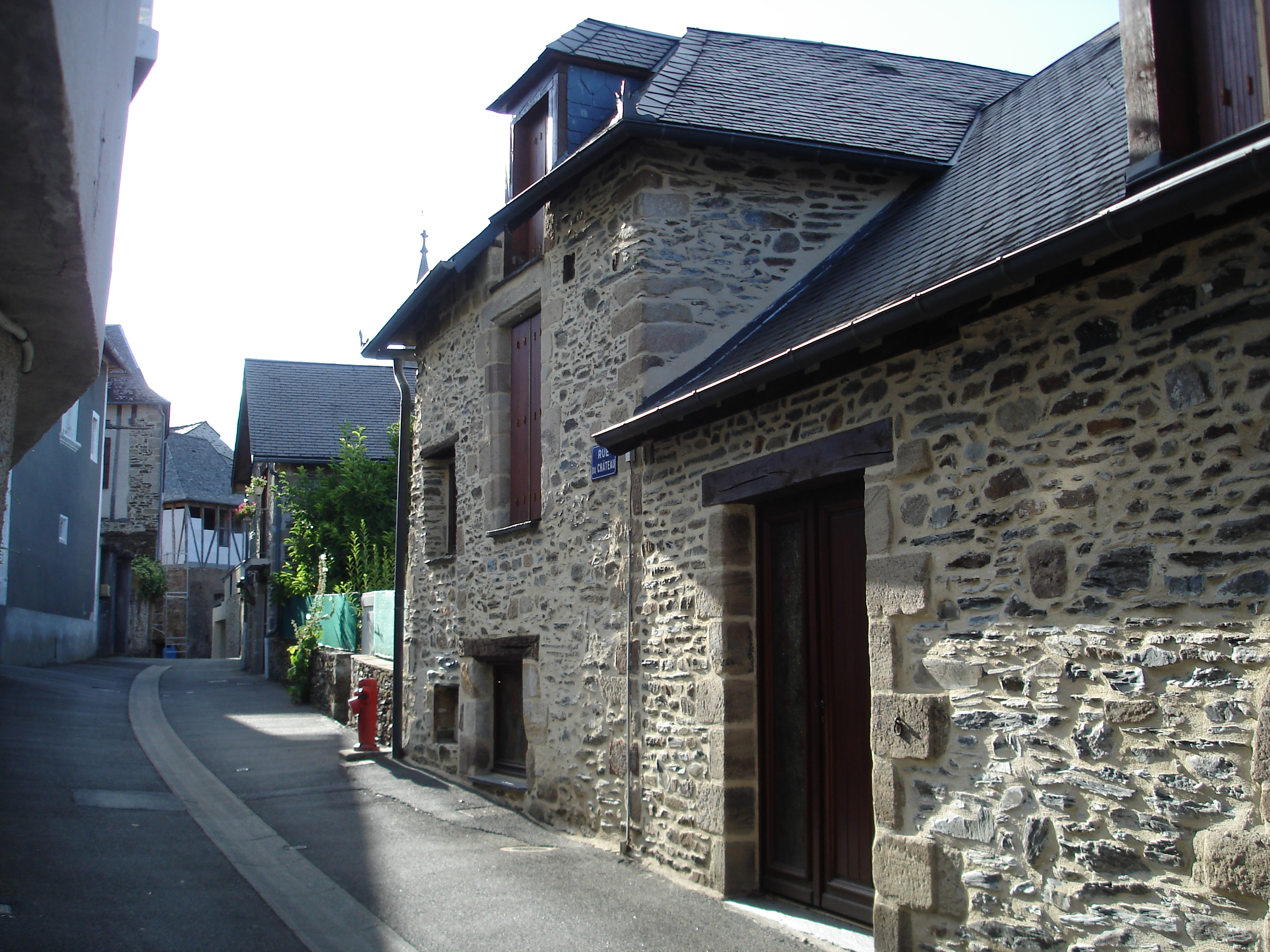
- A mediaeval street in Donzenac

- Coat of arms
- Location of Donzenac
- Location within France Location within Nouvelle-Aquitaine
- Coordinates: 45°13′41″N 1°31′30″E
- Country: France
- Region: Nouvelle-Aquitaine
- Department: Corrèze
- Arrondissement: Brive-la-Gaillarde
- Canton: Allassac
- Intercommunality: CA Bassin de Brive

Government
  - Mayor (2026–32): Jean-François Chevreuil
- Area^{1}: 24.12 km^{2} (9.31 sq mi)
- Elevation: 204 m (669 ft)
- Highest elevation: 388 m (1,273 ft)
- Lowest elevation: 112 m (367 ft)
- Population (2023): 2,733
  - Density: 113.3/km^{2} (293.5/sq mi)
- Time zone: UTC+01:00 (CET)
  - Summer (DST): UTC+02:00 (CEST)
- INSEE/Postal code: 19072 /19270
- ^{1} French Land Register data, which excludes lakes, ponds, glaciers > 1 km^{2} (0.386 sq mi or 247 acres) and river estuaries.

Donzenac (French pronunciation: [dɔ̃znak]) is a commune in the Corrèze department in central France.

The commune is listed as a Village étape.

== Geography ==
Commune of the urban area of Brive-la-Gaillarde located in the Massif Central on the national road N20, 10 km north of Brive-la-Gaillarde.

Perched on an outcrop dominating the Maumont, resulting from the confluence of the Maumont Blanc and the Maumont Noir. Another tributary of the Maumont, the Clan stream waters the western part of the communal territory.

The Château district, Donzenac, a former fortified village, still retains its medieval appearance with its high walls, narrow, winding lanes that all return to the Church district.

The village of Travassac, located 3 km above the town, is one of the most important hamlets of the commune. It is a typical village once inhabited by slate workers who worked in the quarry.

This hamlet is home to a vertically operated former open slate quarry. This unique site in Europe is now open to the public.

== Population ==
Historical population
Year	Pop.	±% p.a.
1968	1,884	—
1975	1,795	−0.69%
1982	1,908	+0.88%
1990	2,050	+0.90%
1999	2,147	+0.52%
2007	2,387	+1.33%
2012	2,584	+1.60%
2017	2,651	+0.51%
2023	2,733	+0.51%
Source: INSEE

== Places and monuments ==
- L'église Saint-Martin - surrounded by a few old houses, retains a 14th century bell tower. The bell tower was classified as a historical monument in 1932;
- Chapelle des Pénitents de Donzenac - listed in 1967 as a historic monument;
- Building on the Place du Marché - listed in 1967 as a historic monument;
- The 13th century house - Rue du Puy-Broc, listed in 1967 as a historic monument;
- The Travassac slate quarries located in the hamlet of Travassac, a former mining site now open to the public for guided tours and now one of the major private tourist sites in the Corrèze department. The exploitation of seven slate veins over three centuries has formed parallel steep cliffs of unexploitable rock (with too high a quartz content) from 50 to 150m deep. In 2020, the " Ardoisières de Corrèze " was one of the last two slate sites still in operation in France, along with Labassère, in the Hautes-Pyrénées. Of remarkable quality with only 2% porosity, these Corrèze slates were chosen for the renovation of the Mont-Saint-Michel abbey;.
- The war memorial, located on the Place de la Mairie. It is surmounted by the statue La Victoire en chantant, made by Charles Édouard Richefeu;
- Two mission crosses: one on the D25 road in front of the Donzenac west carpooling area and the other on the Place du Tilleul.

== Notable people ==
- Antoine-Sébastien Lavialle de Masmorel (1781–1852) - French magistrate and politician born on 21 September 1781 in Donzenac.
- Étienne Bussière (1858–1940), French politician, died 9 October 1940 in Donzenac.
- Jacques Genois, former rugby union player, born on 17 September 1950 in Donzenac.

== See also ==
- Communes of the Corrèze department
