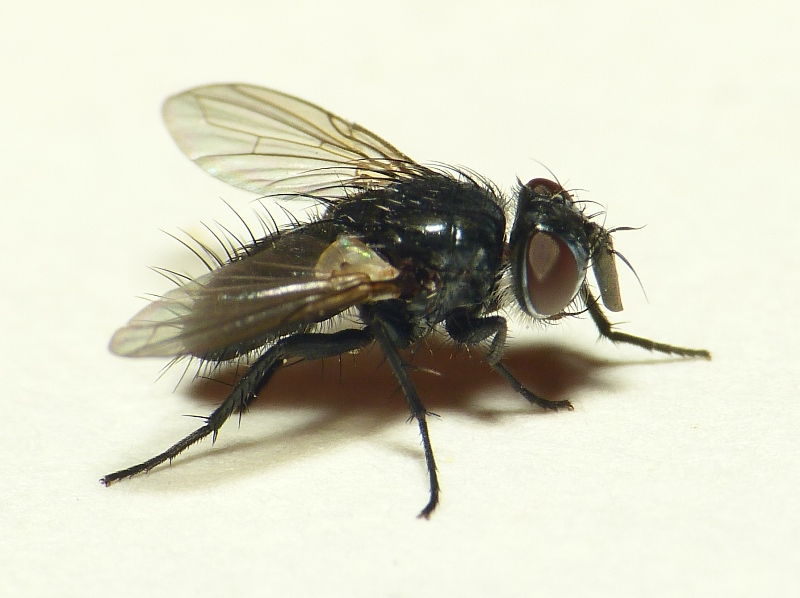
- Ligeria angusticornis

Scientific classification
- Kingdom: Animalia
- Phylum: Arthropoda
- Class: Insecta
- Order: Diptera
- Family: Tachinidae
- Subfamily: Exoristinae
- Tribe: Blondeliini
- Genus: Ligeria; Robineau-Desvoidy, 1863

Type species
- L. petiolata Robineau-Desvoidy, 1863

Synonyms
- Anachaetopsis Brauer & Bergenstamm, 1889; Brachycoelia Meade, 1892

= Ligeria =

Genus of flies

Ligeria is a genus of flies in the family Tachinidae.

== Species ==
- L. angusticornis (Loew, 1847)
- L. latigena Wood, 1985
- L. rostrata Herting, 1971
