= Canton of Allassac =

Coordinates: 45.26°N 1.48°E

The canton of Allassac is an administrative division of the Corrèze department, south-central France. It was created at the French canton reorganisation which came into effect in March 2015. Its seat is in Allassac.

It consists of the following communes:

- Allassac
- Donzenac
- Estivaux
- Orgnac-sur-Vézère
- Perpezac-le-Noir
- Sadroc
- Saint-Bonnet-l'Enfantier
- Sainte-Féréole
- Saint-Pardoux-l'Ortigier
- Saint-Viance
- Troche
- Vigeois
