= Pressure shadow =

A pressure shadow (also called strain shadow) is a term used in metamorphic geology to describe a microstructure in deformed rocks that occurs adjacent to a relatively large, undeformed particle, such as a porphyroclast. Pressure shadows often appear in thin sections as pairs of roughly triangular regions that are elongated parallel to the foliation around a clast of a different mineral. Pressure shadows that contain fibrous mineral textures are also termed pressure fringes or strain fringes.

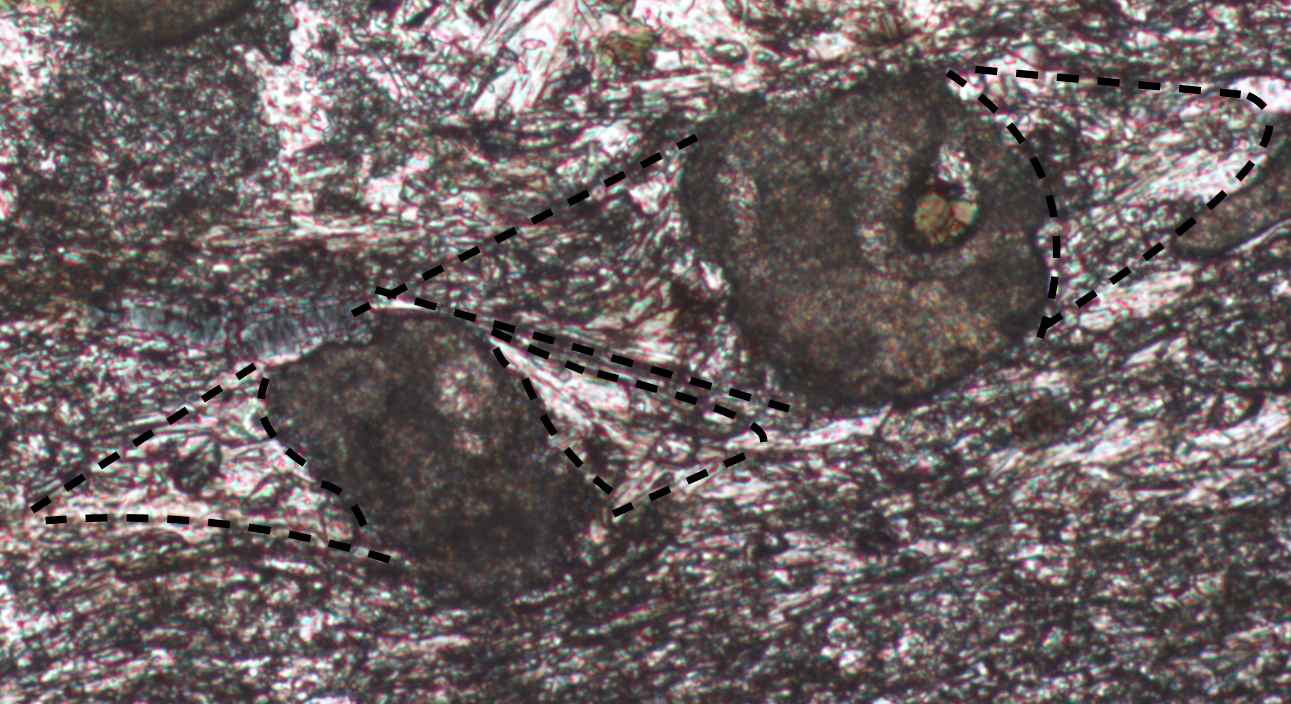
Pressure shadows regions (indicated by dashed lines) around porphyroclasts in a deformed granodiorite.

== Formation ==
During deformation, minerals can migrate by plastic flow or may grow by diffusive mass transport into the lower-stress regions created by a rigid porphyroclast or porphyroblast.
