= Perpezac-le-Noir =

- Commune
- Coat of arms
- Location of Perpezac-le-Noir
- Location within France Location within Nouvelle-Aquitaine
- Coordinates: 45°19′38″N 1°33′11″E
- Country: France
- Region: Nouvelle-Aquitaine
- Department: Corrèze
- Arrondissement: Tulle
- Canton: Allassac

Government
  - Mayor (2020–2026): Jérôme Sagne
- Area^{1}: 24.79 km^{2} (9.57 sq mi)
- Elevation: 367 m (1,204 ft)
- Highest elevation: 452 m (1,483 ft)
- Lowest elevation: 278 m (912 ft)
- Population (2023): 1,270
  - Density: 51.2/km^{2} (133/sq mi)
- Time zone: UTC+01:00 (CET)
  - Summer (DST): UTC+02:00 (CEST)
- INSEE/Postal code: 19162 /19410
- ^{1} French Land Register data, which excludes lakes, ponds, glaciers > 1 km^{2} (0.386 sq mi or 247 acres) and river estuaries.

Perpezac-le-Noir (French pronunciation: [pɛʁpəzak lə nwaʁ]; Occitan: Perpesac lo Negre) is a commune in the Corrèze department in central France.

== Population ==
Historical population
Year	Pop.	±% p.a.
1968	971	—
1975	886	−1.30%
1982	830	−0.93%
1990	870	+0.59%
1999	875	+0.06%
2007	1,021	+1.95%
2012	1,077	+1.07%
2017	1,166	+1.60%
2023	1,270	+1.43%
Source: INSEE

== See also ==
- Communes of the Corrèze department
