= Orgnac-sur-Vézère =

- Commune
- Coat of arms
- Location of Orgnac-sur-Vézère
- Location within France Location within Nouvelle-Aquitaine
- Coordinates: 45°19′58″N 1°26′34″E
- Country: France
- Region: Nouvelle-Aquitaine
- Department: Corrèze
- Arrondissement: Tulle
- Canton: Allassac

Government
  - Mayor (2020–2026): Milena Loubriat
- Area^{1}: 18.76 km^{2} (7.24 sq mi)
- Elevation: 350 m (1,150 ft)
- Highest elevation: 406 m (1,332 ft)
- Lowest elevation: 171 m (561 ft)
- Population (2023): 325
  - Density: 17.3/km^{2} (44.9/sq mi)
- Time zone: UTC+01:00 (CET)
  - Summer (DST): UTC+02:00 (CEST)
- INSEE/Postal code: 19154 /19410
- ^{1} French Land Register data, which excludes lakes, ponds, glaciers > 1 km^{2} (0.386 sq mi or 247 acres) and river estuaries.

Orgnac-sur-Vézère (French pronunciation: [ɔʁɲak syʁ vezɛʁ], literally Orgnac on Vézère; Occitan: Ornhac de Vesera) is a commune in the Corrèze department in central France.

== Population ==
Historical population
Year	Pop.	±% p.a.
1968	493	—
1975	379	−3.69%
1982	338	−1.62%
1990	323	−0.57%
1999	304	−0.67%
2007	304	+0.00%
2012	304	+0.00%
2017	313	+0.59%
2023	325	+0.63%
Source: INSEE

== See also ==
- Communes of the Corrèze department
