= 2016 United States House of Representatives elections in California =

- November 8, 2016

All 53 California seats to the United States House of Representatives
	Majority party	Minority party
Party	Democratic	Republican
Last election	39	14
Seats won	39	14
Seat change	Steady	Steady
Popular vote	8,358,598	4,947,867
Percentage	62.31%	36.89%
Swing	▲3.40%	▼2.60%

Democratic hold
Republican hold
Democratic
50–60%
60–70%
70–80%
80–90%
90–100%
Republican
50–60%
60–70%
70–80%

The 2016 United States House of Representatives elections in California were held on Tuesday, November 8, 2016, with a primary election on June 7, 2016. Voters elected the 53 U.S. representatives from the state of California, one from each of the state's 53 congressional districts. The elections coincided with the elections of other offices, including a presidential election, as well as other elections to the House of Representatives, elections to the United States Senate and various state and local elections. All seats in California retained their partisan control from the 2014 house elections.

== Overview ==
United States House of Representatives elections in California, 2016 Primary election — June 7, 2016
Party	Votes	Percentage	Candidates	Advancing to general	Seats contesting
Democratic	4,915,447	63.91%	99	60	53
Republican	2,624,761	34.13%	86	44	44
No party preference	122,209	1.59%	19	2	2
Green	14,302	0.19%	2	0	0
Libertarian	8,154	0.11%	2	0	0
Peace and Freedom	6,400	0.08%	1	0	0
Valid votes	7,691,273	89.97%	—	—	—
Invalid votes	857,028	10.03%	—	—	—
Totals	8,548,301	100.00%	209	106	—
Voter turnout	47.72%				

United States House of Representatives elections in California, 2016 General election — November 8, 2016
Party	Votes	Percentage	Seats	+/–
Democratic	7,417,967	63.49%	39	Steady
Republican	4,172,087	35.71%	14	Steady
No party preference	94,312	0.81%	0	Steady
Valid votes			—	—
Invalid votes			—	—
Totals	11,684,366	100.00%	53	—
Voter turnout				

== District 1 ==
2016 California's 1st congressional district election
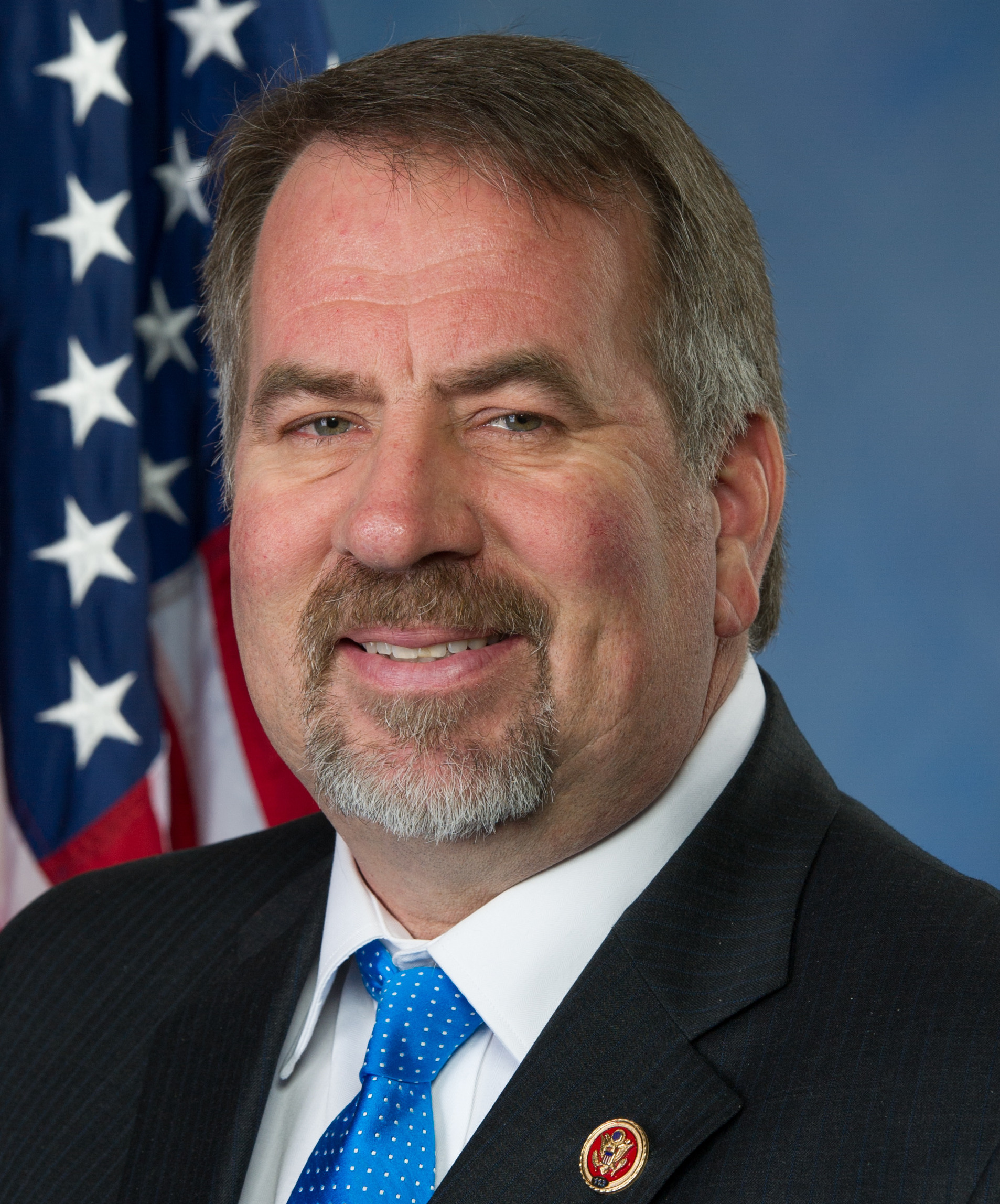

Candidate	Doug LaMalfa	Jim Reed
Party	Republican	Democratic
Popular vote	185,448	128,588
Percentage	59.1%	40.9%
- County results LaMalfa: 50–60% 60–70% 70–80%
U.S. Representative before election
Doug LaMalfa
Republican
Elected U.S. Representative
Doug LaMalfa
Republican

The 1st district is based in inland Northern California and includes Chico and Redding. Incumbent Republican Doug LaMalfa, who had represented the 1st district since 2013, ran for re-election.

=== Primary election ===
==== Republican candidates ====
===== Advanced to general =====
- Doug LaMalfa, incumbent U.S. Representative

===== Eliminated in primary =====
- Gregory Cheadle, real estate broker and candidate for this seat in 2012 & 2014
- Joe Montes, small businessman
- Gary Allen Oxley, emergency room nurse

===== Withdrawn =====
- Doug Wright, attorney

==== Democratic candidates ====
===== Advanced to general =====
- Jim Reed, attorney and nominee for this seat in 2010 & 2012

===== Eliminated in primary =====
- David Peterson, accountability system developer and candidate for the 12th district in 2012 & 2014

==== Endorsements ====
Jim Reed (D)

Organizations

- California Democratic Party

==== Results ====
Nonpartisan blanket primary results
Party	Candidate	Votes	%
Republican	Doug LaMalfa (incumbent)	86,136	40.8
Democratic	Jim Reed	59,665	28.3
Republican	Joe Montes	35,875	17.0
Democratic	David Peterson	13,430	6.4
Republican	Gary Allen Oxley	6,885	3.3
No party preference	Jeff Gerlach	4,958	2.3
Republican	Gregory Cheadle	4,217	2.0
Total votes		211,166	100.0

=== General election ===
==== Predictions ====
Source	Ranking	As of
The Cook Political Report	Safe R	November 7, 2016
Daily Kos Elections	Safe R	November 7, 2016
Rothenberg	Safe R	November 3, 2016
Sabato's Crystal Ball	Safe R	November 7, 2016
RCP	Safe R	October 31, 2016

==== Endorsements ====
Doug LaMalfa (R)

Organizations

- Campaign for Working Families
Jim Reed (D)

Labor unions

- AFL-CIO
- International Brotherhood of Boilermakers

==== Results ====
California's 1st congressional district election, 2016
Party	Candidate	Votes	%
Republican	Doug LaMalfa (incumbent)	185,448	59.1
Democratic	Jim Reed	128,588	40.9
Total votes		314,036	100.0
Republican hold			

== District 2 ==
2016 California's 2nd congressional district election
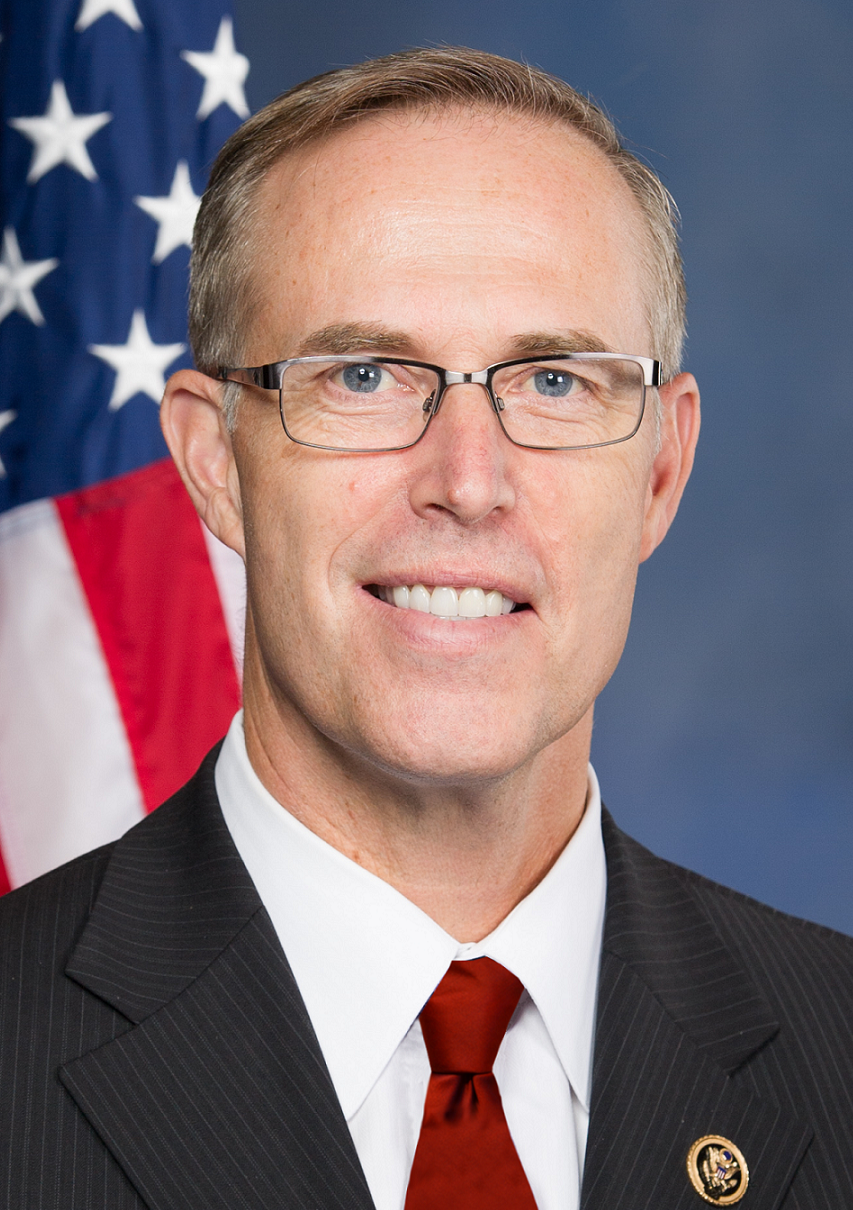

Nominee	Jared Huffman	Dale K. Mensing
Party	Democratic	Republican
Popular vote	254,194	76,572
Percentage	76.9%	23.1%
- County results Huffman: 50–60% 70–80% 80–90%
U.S. Representative before election
Jared Huffman
Democratic
Elected U.S. Representative
Jared Huffman
Democratic

The 2nd district is based in California's North Coast and includes Marin County and Eureka. Incumbent Democrat Jared Huffman, who had represented the 2nd district since 2013, ran for re-election.

=== Primary election ===
==== Democratic candidates ====
===== Advanced to general =====
- Jared Huffman, incumbent U.S. Representative

===== Eliminated in primary =====
- Erin A. Schrode, social entrepreneur

==== Republican candidates ====
===== Advanced to general =====
- Dale K. Mensing, cashier

==== Independent candidates ====
===== Eliminated in primary =====
- Matthew Robert Wookey, middle school teacher

==== Endorsements ====
Jared Huffman (D)

Labor unions

- AFL-CIO

Organizations

- California Democratic Party

==== Results ====
Nonpartisan blanket primary results
Party	Candidate	Votes	%
Democratic	Jared Huffman (incumbent)	157,897	68.3
Republican	Dale K. Mensing	36,187	15.7
Democratic	Erin A. Schrode	20,998	9.1
No party preference	Matthew Robert Wookey	16,092	7.0
Democratic	Andrew Augustine Caffrey (write-in)	6	0.0
Total votes		231,180	100.0

=== General election ===
==== Predictions ====
Source	Ranking	As of
The Cook Political Report	Safe D	November 7, 2016
Daily Kos Elections	Safe D	November 7, 2016
Rothenberg	Safe D	November 3, 2016
Sabato's Crystal Ball	Safe D	November 7, 2016
RCP	Safe D	October 31, 2016

==== Endorsements ====
Jared Huffman (D)

Labor unions

- AFL-CIO
- International Brotherhood of Boilermakers

Organizations

- Equality California

==== Results ====
California's 2nd congressional district election, 2016
Party	Candidate	Votes	%
Democratic	Jared Huffman (incumbent)	254,194	76.9
Republican	Dale K. Mensing	76,572	23.1
Total votes		330,766	100.0
Democratic hold			

== District 3 ==
2016 California's 3rd congressional district election
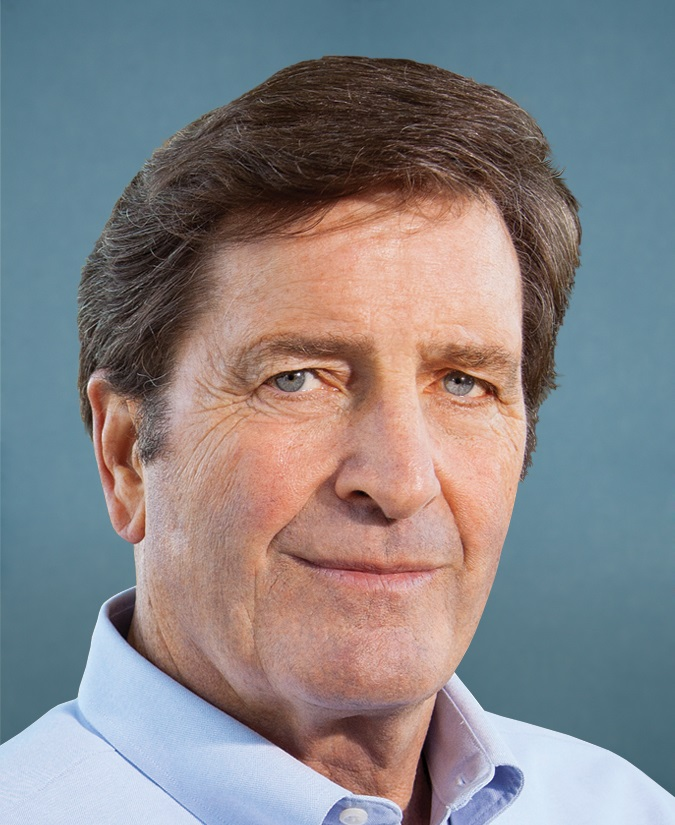

Nominee	John Garamendi	N. Eugene Cleek
Party	Democratic	Republican
Popular vote	152,513	104,453
Percentage	59.4%	40.6%
- County results Garamendi: 50–60% 60–70% 70–80% Cleek: 50–60% 60–70%
U.S. Representative before election
John Garamendi
Democratic
Elected U.S. Representative
John Garamendi
Democratic

The 3rd district is based in north central California and includes Davis, Fairfield, and Yuba City. Incumbent Democrat John Garamendi, who had represented the 3rd district since 2013 and previously represented the 10th district from 2009 to 2013, ran for re-election.

=== Primary election ===
==== Democratic candidates ====
===== Advanced to general =====
- John Garamendi, incumbent U.S. Representative

==== Republican candidates ====
===== Advanced to general =====
- Eugene Cleek, trauma surgeon

===== Eliminated in primary =====
- Ryan Detert, engineer and entrepreneur

==== Endorsements ====
John Garamendi (D)

Labor unions

- AFL-CIO

Organizations

- California Democratic Party

==== Results ====
Nonpartisan blanket primary results
Party	Candidate	Votes	%
Democratic	John Garamendi (incumbent)	98,430	63.1
Republican	N. Eugene Cleek	37,843	24.3
Republican	Ryan Detert	19,699	12.7
Total votes		155,972	100.0

=== General election ===
==== Predictions ====
Source	Ranking	As of
The Cook Political Report	Safe D	November 7, 2016
Daily Kos Elections	Safe D	November 7, 2016
Rothenberg	Safe D	November 3, 2016
Sabato's Crystal Ball	Safe D	November 7, 2016
RCP	Likely D	October 31, 2016

==== Endorsements ====
John Garamendi (D)

Labor unions

- AFL-CIO
- International Brotherhood of Boilermakers

Organizations

- Equality California

==== Results ====
California's 3rd congressional district election, 2016
Party	Candidate	Votes	%
Democratic	John Garamendi (incumbent)	152,513	59.4
Republican	N. Eugene Cleek	104,453	40.6
Total votes		256,966	100.0
Democratic hold			

== District 4 ==
2016 California's 4th congressional district election
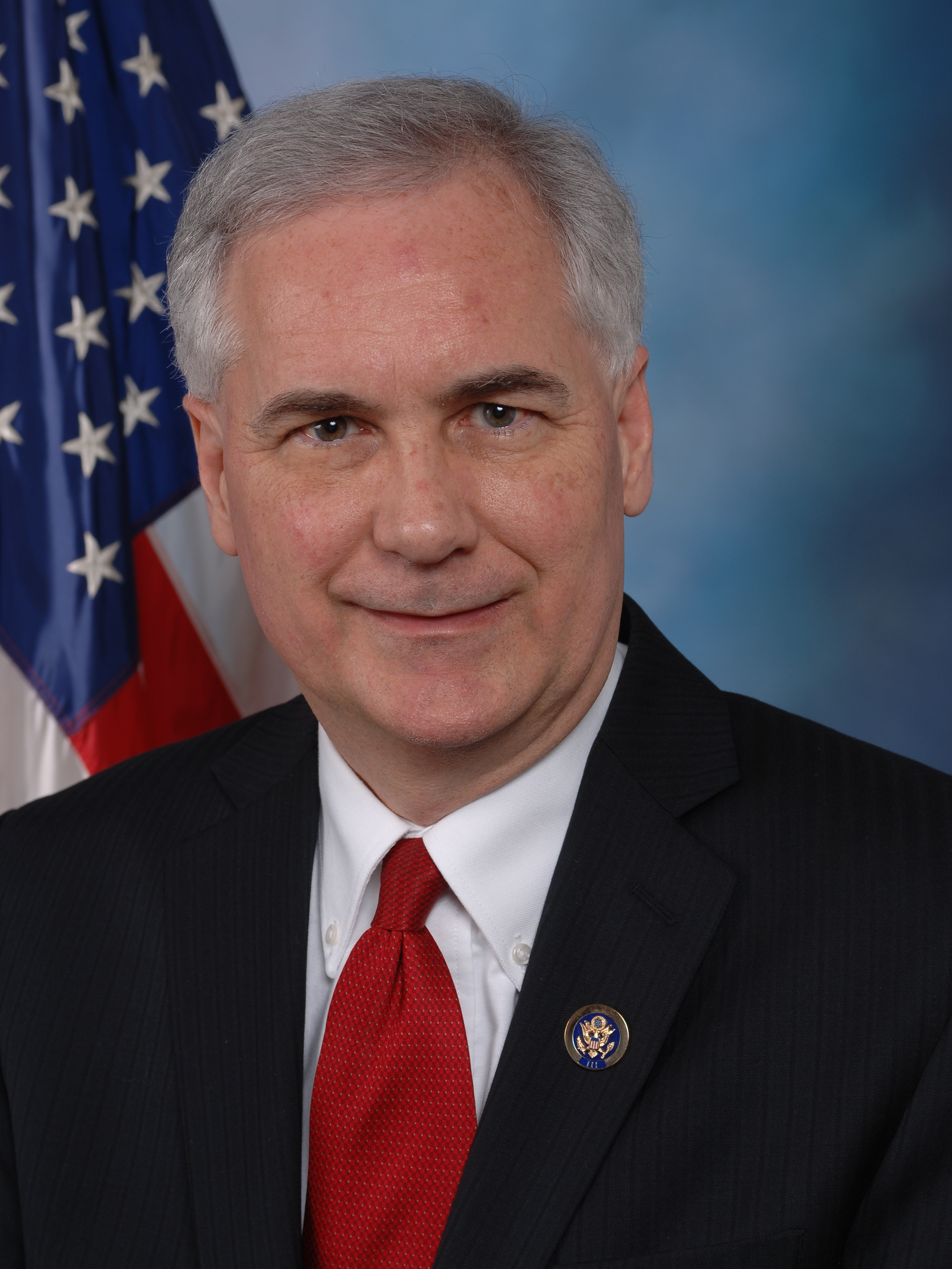

Nominee	Tom McClintock	Robert W. Derlet
Party	Republican	Democratic
Popular vote	220,133	130,845
Percentage	62.7%	37.3%
- County results Mcclintock: 60–70% 70–80% Derlet: 50–60% 60–70%
U.S. Representative before election
Tom McClintock
Republican
Elected U.S. Representative
Tom McClintock
Republican

The 4th district is based in east central California and includes Lake Tahoe, Roseville, and Yosemite National Park. Incumbent Republican Tom McClintock, who had represented the 4th district since 2009, ran for re-election.

=== Primary election ===
==== Republican candidates ====
===== Advanced to general =====
- Tom McClintock, incumbent U.S. Representative

===== Withdrawn =====
- Art Moore, business executive, management consultant and candidate for this seat in 2014

==== Democratic candidates ====
===== Advanced to general =====
- Robert Derlet, physician

===== Eliminated in primary =====
- Sean White, solar instructor and author

==== Endorsements ====
Robert Derlet (D)

Labor unions

- AFL-CIO

Organizations

- California Democratic Party

==== Results ====
Nonpartisan blanket primary results
Party	Candidate	Votes	%
Republican	Tom McClintock (incumbent)	135,626	61.5
Democratic	Robert W. Derlet	60,574	27.5
Democratic	Sean White	24,460	11.1
Total votes		220,660	100.0

=== General election ===
==== Predictions ====
Source	Ranking	As of
The Cook Political Report	Safe R	November 7, 2016
Daily Kos Elections	Safe R	November 7, 2016
Rothenberg	Safe R	November 3, 2016
Sabato's Crystal Ball	Safe R	November 7, 2016
RCP	Safe R	October 31, 2016

==== Endorsements ====
Tom McClintock (R)

Organizations

- Campaign for Working Families
Robert Derlet (D)

Labor unions

- AFL-CIO
- International Brotherhood of Boilermakers

==== Results ====
California's 4th congressional district election, 2016
Party	Candidate	Votes	%
Republican	Tom McClintock (incumbent)	220,133	62.7
Democratic	Robert W. Derlet	130,845	37.3
Total votes		350,978	100.0
Republican hold			

== District 5 ==
2016 California's 5th congressional district election
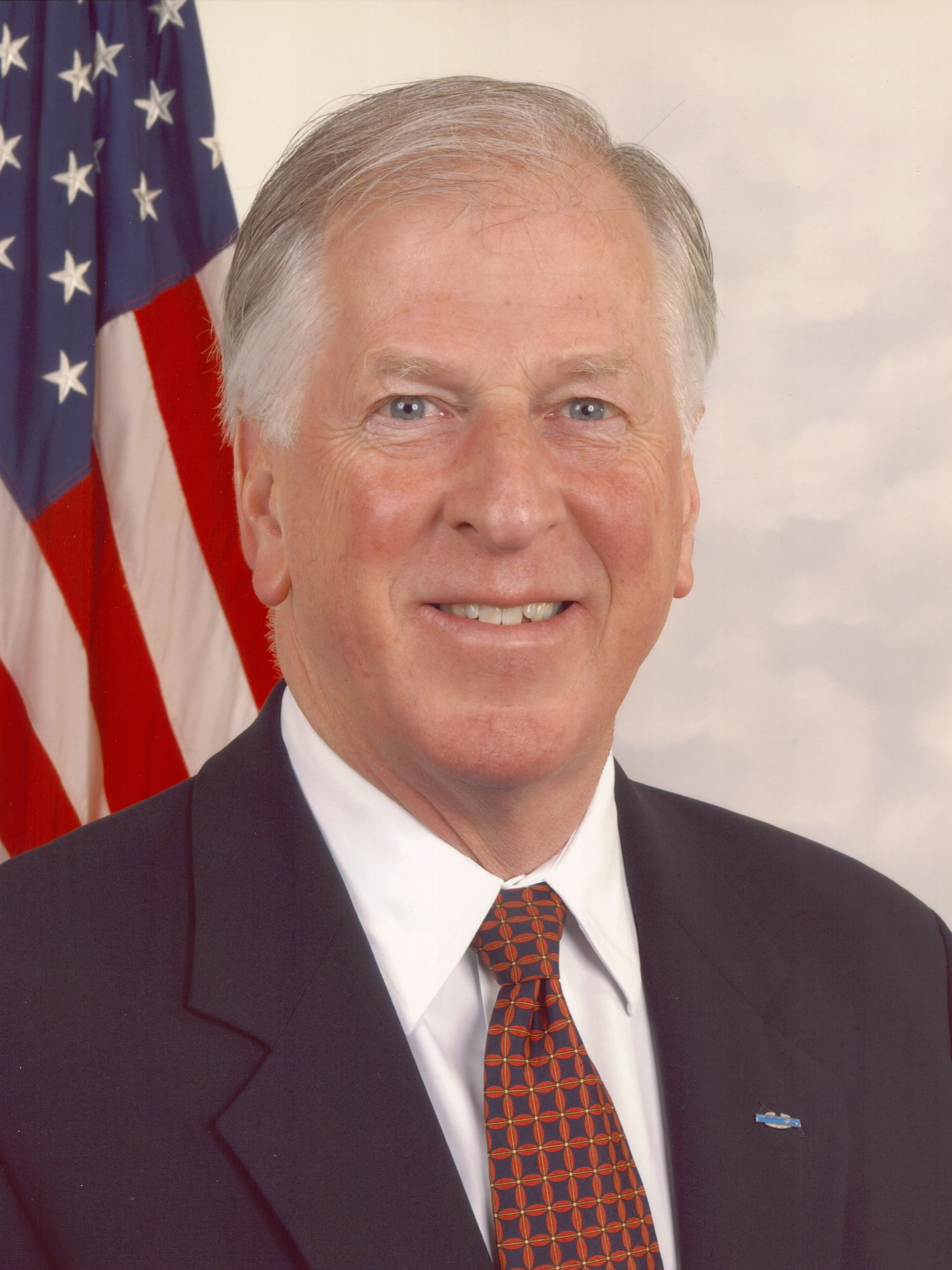

Nominee	Mike Thompson	Carlos Santamaria
Party	Democratic	Republican
Popular vote	224,526	67,565
Percentage	76.9%	23.1%
- County results Thompson: 60–70% 70–80%
U.S. Representative before election
Mike Thompson
Democratic
Elected U.S. Representative
Mike Thompson
Democratic

The 5th district is based in the North Bay and includes Napa, Santa Rosa, and Vallejo. Incumbent Democrat Mike Thompson, who had represented the 5th district since 2013 and previously represented the 1st district from 1999 to 2013, ran for re-election.

=== Primary election ===
==== Democratic candidates ====
===== Advanced to general =====
- Mike Thompson, incumbent U.S. Representative

===== Eliminated in primary =====
- Nils Palsson, community builder and educator
- Alex Poling, systems administrator

==== Republican candidates ====
===== Advanced to general =====
- Carlos Santamaria, business owner and consultant

==== Endorsements ====
Mike Thompson (D)

Labor unions

- AFL-CIO

Organizations

- California Democratic Party

==== Results ====
Nonpartisan blanket primary results
Party	Candidate	Votes	%
Democratic	Mike Thompson (incumbent)	124,634	65.7
Republican	Carlos Santamaria	36,430	19.2
Democratic	Nils Palsson	23,639	12.5
Democratic	Alex Poling	4,998	2.6
Total votes		189,701	100.0

=== General election ===
==== Predictions ====
Source	Ranking	As of
The Cook Political Report	Safe D	November 7, 2016
Daily Kos Elections	Safe D	November 7, 2016
Rothenberg	Safe D	November 3, 2016
Sabato's Crystal Ball	Safe D	November 7, 2016
RCP	Safe D	October 31, 2016

==== Endorsements ====
Mike Thompson (D)

Labor unions

- AFL-CIO
- International Brotherhood of Boilermakers

Organizations

- Blue Dog Coalition
- Equality California

==== Results ====
California's 5th congressional district election, 2016
Party	Candidate	Votes	%
Democratic	Mike Thompson (incumbent)	224,526	76.9
Republican	Carlos Santamaria	67,565	23.1
Total votes		292,091	100.0
Democratic hold			

== District 6 ==
2016 California's 6th congressional district election
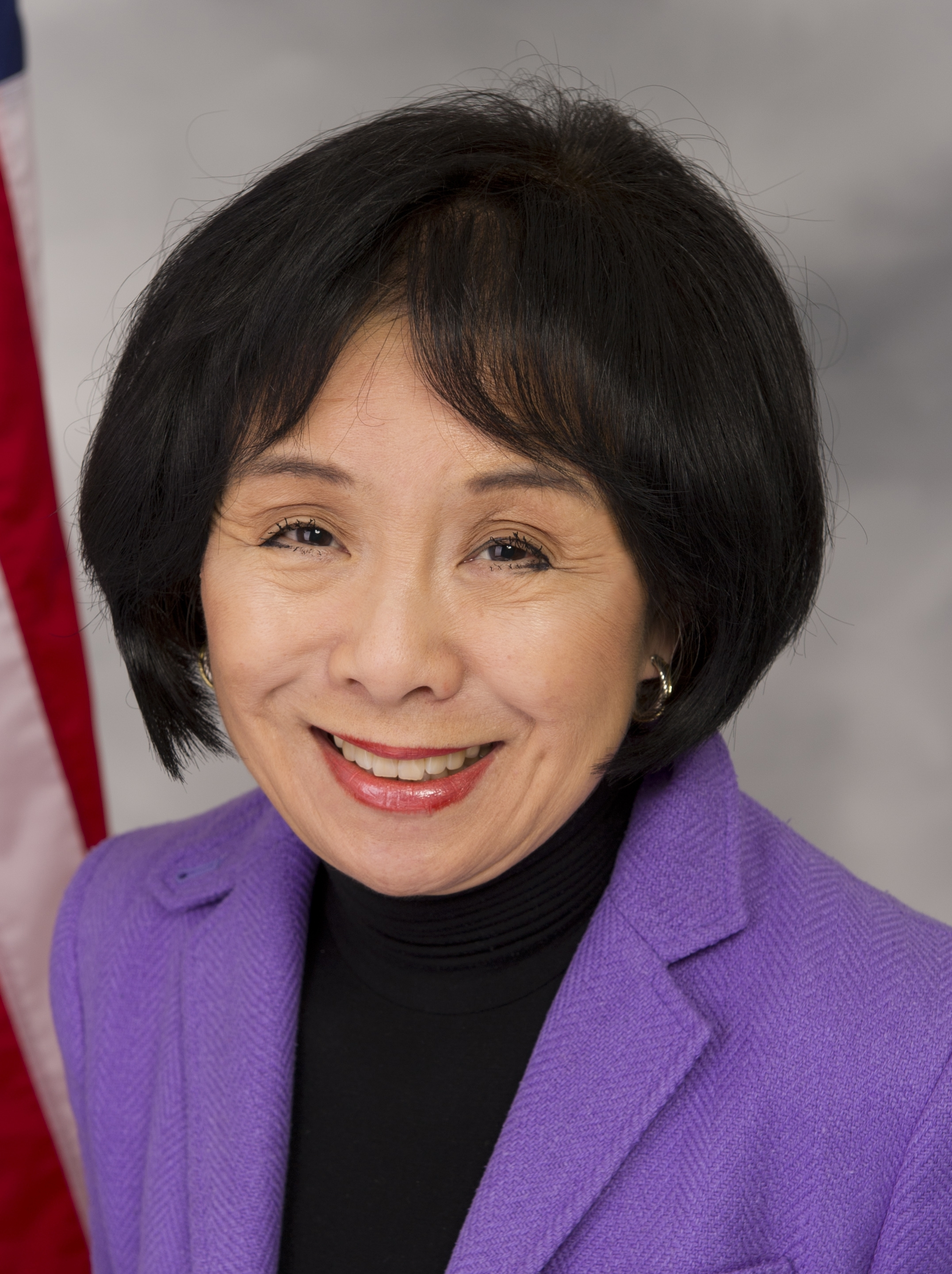

Nominee	Doris Matsui	Robert Evans
Party	Democratic	Republican
Popular vote	177,565	57,848
Percentage	75.4%	24.6%
- County results Matsui: 60–70% 70–80%
U.S. Representative before election
Doris Matsui
Democratic
Elected U.S. Representative
Doris Matsui
Democratic

The 6th district is based in north central California and includes Sacramento. Incumbent Democrat Doris Matsui, who had represented the 6th district since 2013 and previously represented the 5th district from 2005 to 2013, ran for re-election.

=== Primary election ===
==== Democratic candidates ====
===== Advanced to general =====
- Doris Matsui, incumbent U.S. Representative

===== Eliminated in primary =====
- Jrmar Jefferson, community volunteer

==== Republican candidates ====
===== Advanced to general =====
- Robert Evans, retired government auditor

==== Independent candidates ====
===== Eliminated in primary =====
- Mario Galván, teacher
- Yuriy Seretskiy, software engineer

==== Endorsements ====
Doris Matsui (D)

Labor unions

- AFL-CIO

Organizations

- California Democratic Party

==== Results ====
Nonpartisan blanket primary results
Party	Candidate	Votes	%
Democratic	Doris Matsui (incumbent)	99,599	70.4
Republican	Robert (Bob) Evans	26,000	18.4
Democratic	Jrmar Jefferson	7,631	5.4
No party preference	Mario Galván	6,354	4.5
No party preference	Yuriy Seretskiy	1,930	1.4
Total votes		141,514	100.0

=== General election ===
==== Predictions ====
Source	Ranking	As of
The Cook Political Report	Safe D	November 7, 2016
Daily Kos Elections	Safe D	November 7, 2016
Rothenberg	Safe D	November 3, 2016
Sabato's Crystal Ball	Safe D	November 7, 2016
RCP	Safe D	October 31, 2016

==== Endorsements ====
Doris Matsui (D)

Labor unions

- AFL-CIO
- Communications Workers of America
- International Brotherhood of Boilermakers

Organizations

- Equality California

==== Results ====
California's 6th congressional district election, 2016
Party	Candidate	Votes	%
Democratic	Doris Matsui (incumbent)	177,565	75.4
Republican	Robert (Bob) Evans	57,848	24.6
Total votes		235,413	100.0
Democratic hold			

== District 7 ==
2016 California's 7th congressional district election
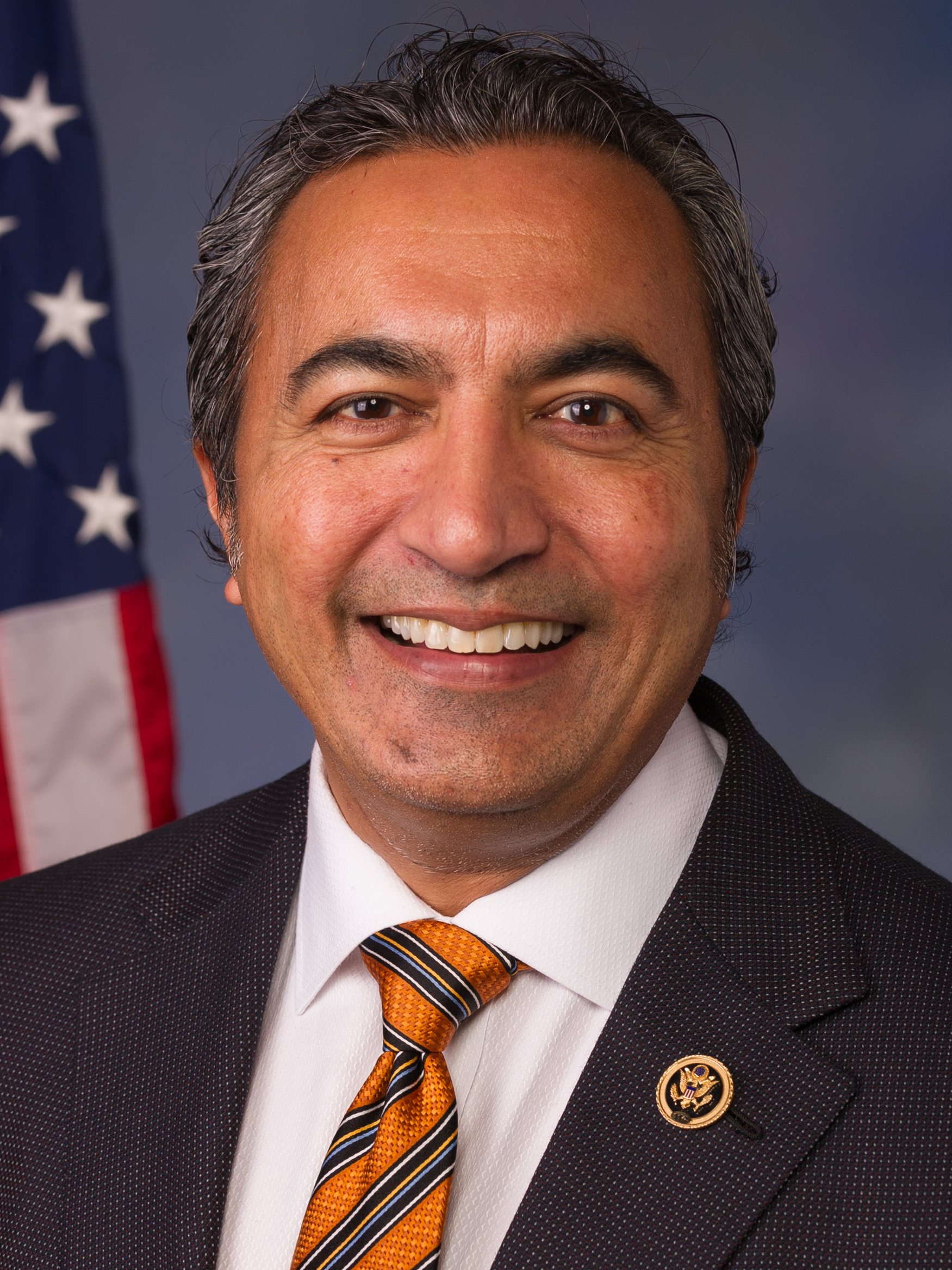

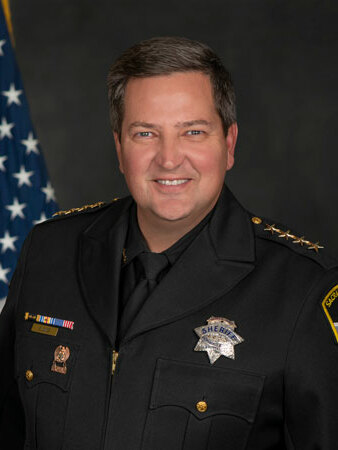
Nominee	Ami Bera	Scott Jones
Party	Democratic	Republican
Popular vote	152,133	145,168
Percentage	51.2%	48.8%
- County results Bera: 50–60%
U.S. Representative before election
Ami Bera
Democratic
Elected U.S. Representative
Ami Bera
Democratic

The 7th district is based in north central California and includes eastern Sacramento County. Incumbent Democrat Ami Bera, who had represented the 7th district since 2013, ran for re-election.

=== Primary election ===
==== Democratic candidates ====
===== Advanced to general =====
- Ami Bera, incumbent U.S. Representative

==== Republican candidates ====
===== Advanced to general =====
- Scott Jones, Sacramento County Sheriff

===== Declined =====
- Roberta MacGlashan, Sacramento County Supervisor
- John McGinness, former Sacramento County Sheriff
- Roger Niello, former state assembly member
- Doug Ose, former U.S. Representative

==== Endorsements ====
Ami Bera (D)

Labor unions

- Service Employees International Union

Organizations

- California Democratic Party

==== Results ====
Nonpartisan blanket primary results
Party	Candidate	Votes	%
Democratic	Ami Bera (incumbent)	93,506	54.0
Republican	Scott Jones	79,640	46.0
Total votes		173,146	100.0

=== General election ===
==== Campaign ====
On May 10, Bera's father, Bob Bera, pleaded guilty to two felony counts of violating campaign finance laws, having made the maximum allowed contribution to his son's campaign in both the 2010 and 2012 election and then got friends and relatives to do the same. Bob Bera would then reimburse them, effectively circumventing campaign finance laws, funnelling $250,000 to the campaign. Ami Bera released a statement claiming to be unaware of his father's activity. He said, "I am incredibly saddened and disappointed in learning what my dad did. While I deeply love my father, it's clear he has made a grave mistake that will have real consequences for him. Neither I, no anyone involved with my campaign, was aware of my father's activities until we learned about them from the U.S. Attorney's Office." Bera also said that he returned the illegal contributions to the U.S. Treasury.

On August 18, Bob Bera was sentenced to a year in prison and fined $100,000. Bera's campaign manager said of the ruling, "This is one of the most difficult experiences of Congressman Bera's and his entire family's lives. Babulal Bera made a grave mistake and he now has to face the consequences of that."

==== Endorsements ====
Ami Bera (D)

Labor unions

- Service Employees International Union

Organizations

- Democratic Congressional Campaign Committee "Frontline" Program
- End Citizens United
- Equality California
Scott Jones (R)

Organizations

- Campaign for Working Families
- National Republican Congressional Committee "Young Guns" Program

==== Debate ====
2016 California's 7th congressional district debate
No.	Date	Host	Moderator	Link	Democratic	Republican
Key: P Participant A Absent N Not invited I Invited W Withdrawn						
Key: P Participant A Absent N Not invited I Invited W Withdrawn					Ami Bera	Scott Jones
1	October 18, 2016	Capital Public Radio; Folsom Lake College; KVIE; Los Rios Community College District; The Sacramento Bee	Jason Schoultz		P	P

==== Polling ====
Poll source	Date(s) administered	Sample size	Margin of error	Ami Bera (D)	Scott Jones (R)	Undecided
Tulchin Research (DCCC)	October 10–12, 2016	400	± 4.9%	50%	39%	11%
Public Opinion Strategies (R-Jones)/NRCC)	October 1–3, 2016	400	± 4.9%	42%	47%	11%
Public Opinion Strategies (R-Jones)	August 14–17, 2016	400	± 4.9%	46%	45%	9%
NMB Research (R-CLF)	August 9–11, 2016	400	± 4.9%	45%	46%	9%

==== Predictions ====
Source	Ranking	As of
The Cook Political Report	Lean D	November 7, 2016
Daily Kos Elections	Lean D	November 7, 2016
Rothenberg	Lean D	November 3, 2016
Sabato's Crystal Ball	Lean D	November 7, 2016
RCP	Lean D	October 31, 2016

==== Results ====
California's 7th congressional district election, 2016
Party	Candidate	Votes	%
Democratic	Ami Bera (incumbent)	152,133	51.2
Republican	Scott Jones	145,168	48.8
Total votes		297,301	100.0
Democratic hold			

== District 8 ==
2016 California's 8th congressional district election
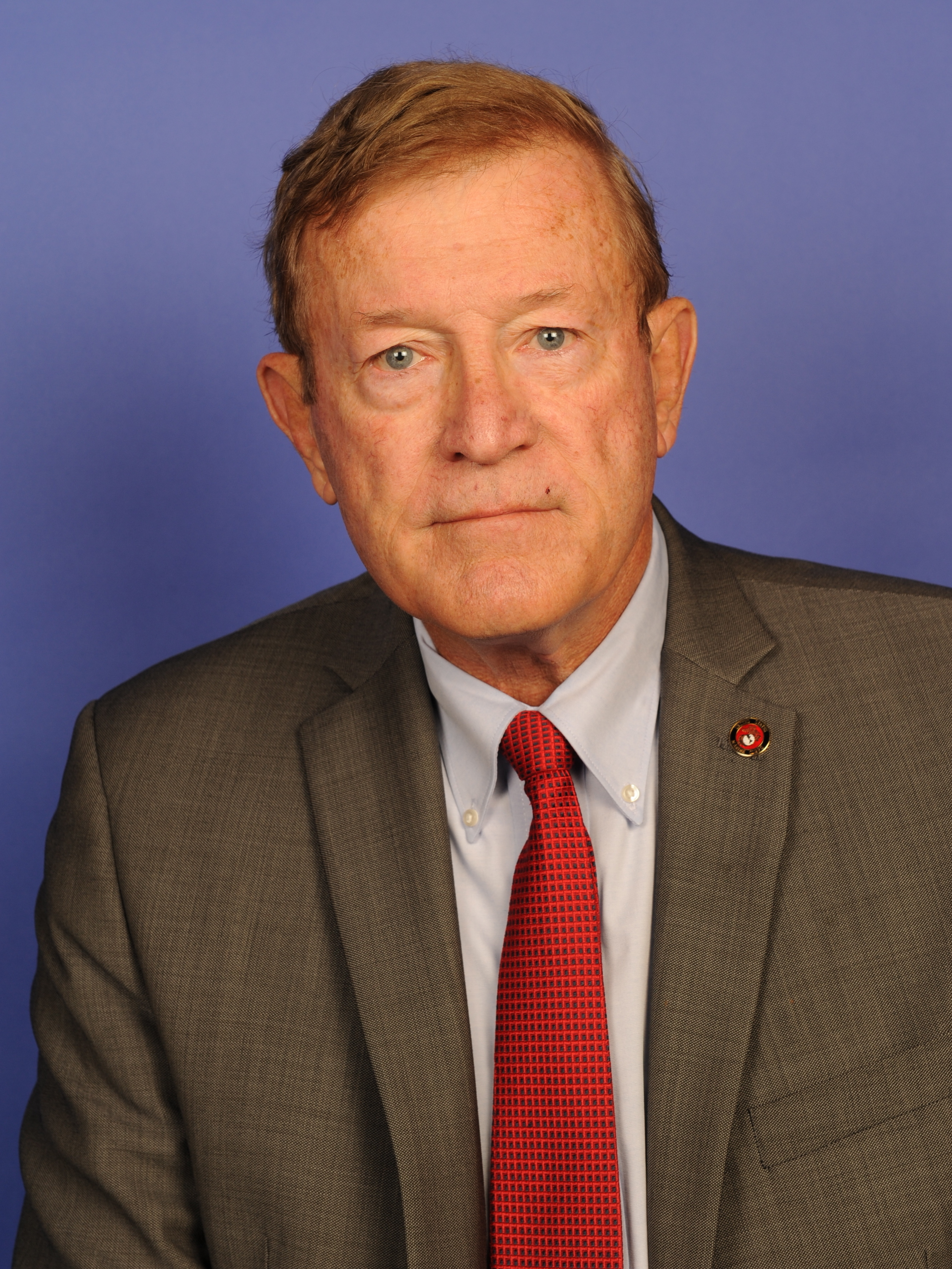

Nominee	Paul Cook	Rita Ramirez
Party	Republican	Democratic
Popular vote	136,972	83,035
Percentage	62.3%	37.7%
- County results Cook: 60–70% Ramirez: 50–60%
U.S. Representative before election
Paul Cook
Republican
Elected U.S. Representative
Paul Cook
Republican

The 8th district is based in the eastern High Desert and includes Victorville and Yucaipa. Incumbent Republican Paul Cook, who had represented the 8th district since 2013, ran for re-election.

=== Primary election ===
==== Republican candidates ====
===== Advanced to general =====
- Paul Cook, incumbent U.S. Representative

===== Eliminated in primary =====
- Tim Donnelly, former state assembly member and candidate for governor in 2014

==== Democratic candidates ====
===== Advanced to general =====
- Rita Ramirez, retired college professor

===== Eliminated in primary =====
- Roger La Plante, retired army sergeant
- John Pinkerton, Victor Valley community college trustee

==== Endorsements ====
Paul Cook (R)

Labor unions

- AFL-CIO

==== Results ====
Nonpartisan blanket primary results
Party	Candidate	Votes	%
Republican	Paul Cook (incumbent)	50,425	42.0
Democratic	Rita Ramirez	26,325	21.9
Republican	Tim Donnelly	24,886	20.7
Democratic	John Pinkerton	11,780	9.8
Democratic	Roger La Plante	6,661	5.5
Total votes		120,077	100.0

=== General election ===
==== Predictions ====
Source	Ranking	As of
The Cook Political Report	Safe R	November 7, 2016
Daily Kos Elections	Safe R	November 7, 2016
Rothenberg	Safe R	November 3, 2016
Sabato's Crystal Ball	Safe R	November 7, 2016
RCP	Safe R	October 31, 2016

==== Endorsements ====
Paul Cook (R)

Labor unions

- AFL-CIO
- Communications Workers of America
- International Brotherhood of Boilermakers

==== Results ====
California's 8th congressional district election, 2016
Party	Candidate	Votes	%
Republican	Paul Cook (incumbent)	136,972	62.3
Democratic	Rita Ramirez	83,035	37.7
Total votes		220,007	100.0
Republican hold			

== District 9 ==
2016 California's 9th congressional district election

Nominee	Jerry McNerney	Antonio Amador
Party	Democratic	Republican
Popular vote	133,163	98,992
Percentage	57.4%	42.6%
- County results Mcnerney: 50–60% 60–70% Amador: 50–60%
U.S. Representative before election
Jerry McNerney
Democratic
Elected U.S. Representative
Jerry McNerney
Democratic

The 9th district is based in the Central Valley and includes the San Joaquin Delta and Stockton. Incumbent Democrat Jerry McNerney, who had represented the 9th district since 2013 and previously represented the 11th district from 2007 to 2013, ran for re-election.

=== Primary election ===
==== Democratic candidates ====
===== Advanced to general =====
- Jerry McNerney, incumbent U.S. Representative

==== Republican candidates ====
===== Advanced to general =====
- Antonio "Tony" Amador, retired U.S. Marshal and general election candidate for this seat in 2014

===== Eliminated in primary =====
- Kathryn Nance, Stockton Police Sergeant

==== Libertarian candidates ====
===== Eliminated in primary =====
- Alex Appleby, manager and financial advisor

==== Endorsements ====
Jerry McNerney (D)

Labor unions

- AFL-CIO
- Service Employees International Union

Organizations

- California Democratic Party

==== Results ====
Nonpartisan blanket primary results
Party	Candidate	Votes	%
Democratic	Jerry McNerney (incumbent)	71,634	55.3
Republican	Antonio C. "Tony" Amador	28,161	21.7
Republican	Kathryn Nance	24,783	19.1
Libertarian	Alex Appleby	5,029	3.9
Total votes		129,607	100.0

=== General election ===
==== Predictions ====
Source	Ranking	As of
The Cook Political Report	Safe D	November 7, 2016
Daily Kos Elections	Safe D	November 7, 2016
Rothenberg	Safe D	November 3, 2016
Sabato's Crystal Ball	Safe D	November 7, 2016
RCP	Safe D	October 31, 2016

==== Endorsements ====
Jerry McNerney (D)

Labor unions

- AFL-CIO
- Communications Workers of America
- International Brotherhood of Boilermakers
- Service Employees International Union

Organizations

- Equality California

==== Results ====
California's 9th congressional district election, 2016
Party	Candidate	Votes	%
Democratic	Jerry McNerney (incumbent)	133,163	57.4
Republican	Antonio C. "Tony" Amador	98,992	42.6
Total votes		232,155	100.0
Democratic hold			

== District 10 ==
2016 California's 10th congressional district election
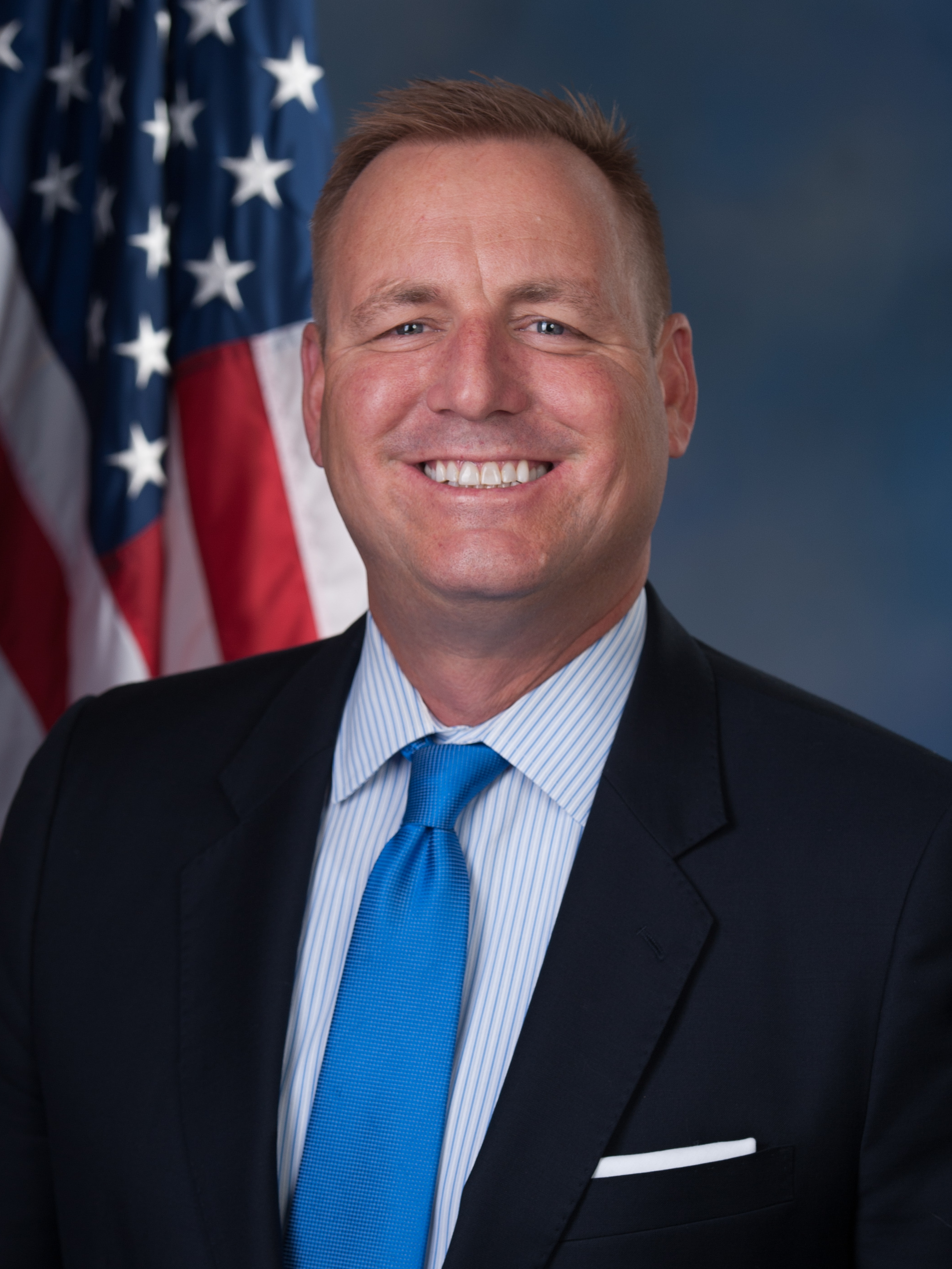

Nominee	Jeff Denham	Michael Eggman
Party	Republican	Democratic
Popular vote	124,671	116,470
Percentage	51.7%	48.3%
- County results Denham: 50–60%
U.S. Representative before election
Jeff Denham
Republican
Elected U.S. Representative
Jeff Denham
Republican

The 10th district is based in the Central Valley and includes Modesto and Tracy. Incumbent Republican Jeff Denham, who had represented the 10th district since 2013 and previously represented the 19th district from 2011 to 2013, ran for re-election.

=== Primary election ===
==== Republican candidates ====
===== Advanced to general =====
- Jeff Denham, incumbent U.S. Representative

===== Eliminated in primary =====
- Robert Hodges, farmer

==== Democratic candidates ====
===== Advanced to general =====
- Michael Eggman, farmer, small businessman and general election candidate for this seat in 2014

===== Eliminated in primary =====
- Michael J. "Mike" Barkley, accountant and candidate for this seat in 2014

==== Endorsements ====
Michael Eggman (D)

Labor unions

- AFL-CIO
- Service Employees International Union

Organizations

- California Democratic Party

==== Results ====
Nonpartisan blanket primary results
Party	Candidate	Votes	%
Republican	Jeff Denham (incumbent)	61,290	47.7
Democratic	Michael Eggman	35,413	27.4
Democratic	Michael J. "Mike" Barkley	18,576	14.5
Republican	Robert Hodges	13,130	10.2
Total votes		128,409	100.0

=== General election ===
==== Endorsements ====
Jeff Denham (R)

Organizations

- BIPAC
- National Republican Congressional Committee "Patriot" Program
Michael Eggman (D)

Labor unions

- AFL-CIO
- Communications Workers of America
- International Brotherhood of Boilermakers
- Service Employees International Union

Organizations

- Democratic Congressional Campaign Committee "Red to Blue" Program
- End Citizens United
- Equality California

==== Polling ====
Poll source	Date(s) administered	Sample size	Margin of error	Jeff Denham (R)	Michael Eggman (D)	Undecided
Anzalone Liszt Grove (D-Eggman)	October 12–16, 2016	500	± 4.4%	42%	47%	11%
Clarity Campaign Labs (D-House Majority PAC)	October 11–13, 2016	837	± 3.4%	45%	46%	9%
Public Opinion Strategies (R-Denham)/NRCC)	August 28–30, 2016	400	± 4.9%	57%	35%	8%
Latino Decisions (DCCC)	August 18–22, 2016	402	± 4.9%	46%	43%	11%

==== Predictions ====
Source	Ranking	As of
The Cook Political Report	Tossup	November 7, 2016
Daily Kos Elections	Tossup	November 7, 2016
Rothenberg	Lean R	November 3, 2016
Sabato's Crystal Ball	Lean D (flip)	November 7, 2016
RCP	Lean R	October 31, 2016

==== Results ====
California's 10th congressional district election, 2016
Party	Candidate	Votes	%
Republican	Jeff Denham (incumbent)	124,671	51.7
Democratic	Michael Eggman	116,470	48.3
Total votes		241,141	100
Republican hold			

== District 11 ==
2016 California's 11th congressional district election
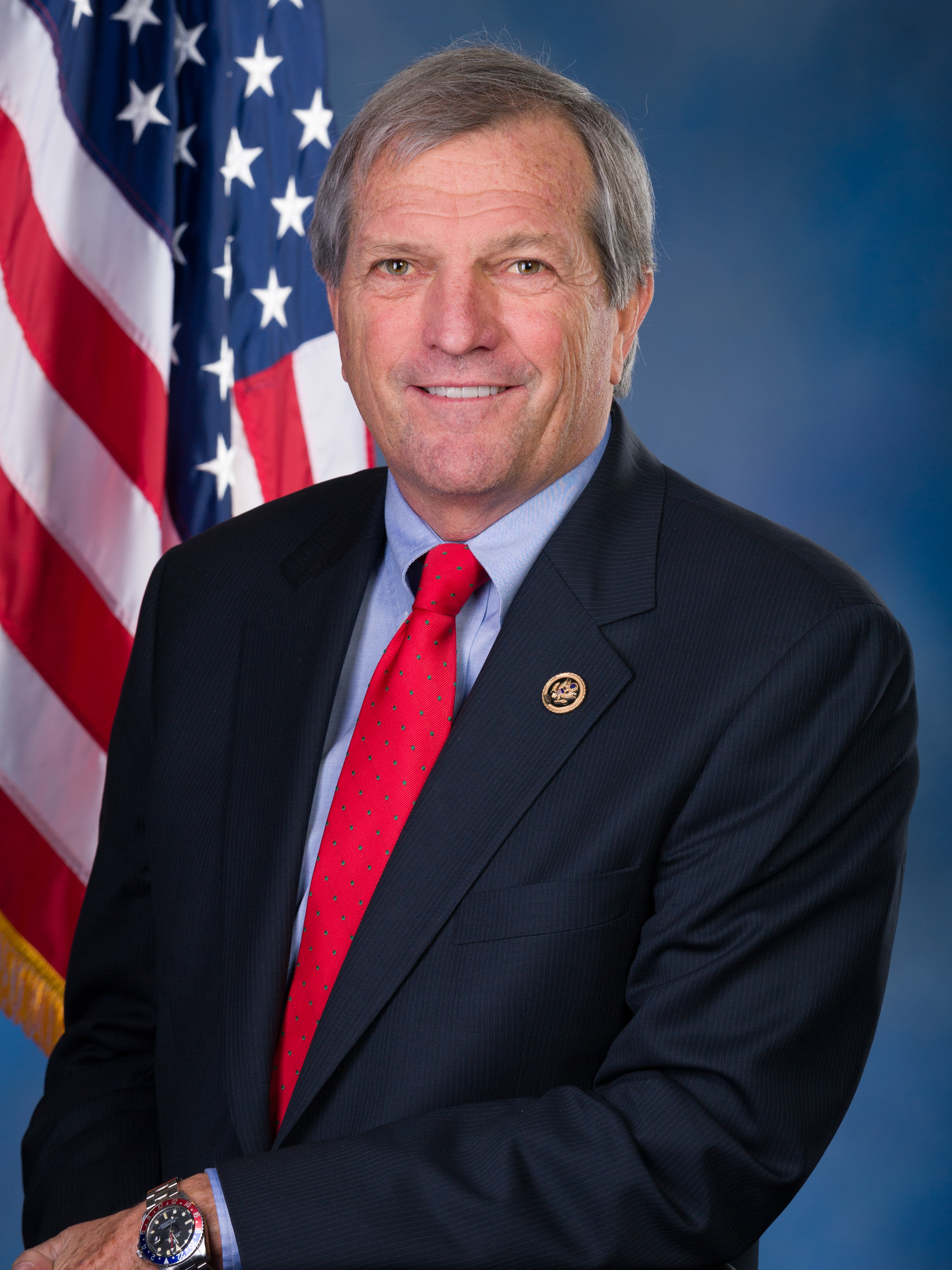

Nominee	Mark DeSaulnier	Roger Allen Petersen
Party	Democratic	Republican
Popular vote	214,868	83,341
Percentage	72.1%	27.9%
- County results Desaulnier: 70–80%
U.S. Representative before election
Mark DeSaulnier
Democratic
Elected U.S. Representative
Mark DeSaulnier
Democratic

The 11th district is based in the East Bay and includes Concord and Richmond. Incumbent Democrat Mark DeSaulnier, who had represented the 11th district since 2015, ran for re-election.

=== Primary election ===
==== Democratic candidates ====
===== Advanced to general =====
- Mark DeSaulnier, incumbent U.S. Representative

==== Republican candidates ====
===== Advanced to general =====
- Roger Allen Petersen, retired HR manager

==== Endorsements ====
Mark DeSaulnier

Labor unions

- AFL-CIO

Organizations

- California Democratic Party

==== Results ====
Nonpartisan blanket primary results
Party	Candidate	Votes	%
Democratic	Mark DeSaulnier (incumbent)	133,317	75.3
Republican	Roger Allen Petersen	43,654	24.7
Total votes		176,971	100.0

=== General election ===
==== Predictions ====
Source	Ranking	As of
The Cook Political Report	Safe D	November 7, 2016
Daily Kos Elections	Safe D	November 7, 2016
Rothenberg	Safe D	November 3, 2016
Sabato's Crystal Ball	Safe D	November 7, 2016
RCP	Safe D	October 31, 2016

==== Endorsements ====
Mark DeSaulnier (D)

Labor unions

- AFL-CIO
- International Brotherhood of Boilermakers

Organizations

- Equality California

==== Results ====
California's 11th congressional district election, 2016
Party	Candidate	Votes	%
Democratic	Mark DeSaulnier (incumbent)	214,868	72.1
Republican	Roger Allen Petersen	83,341	27.9
Total votes		298,209	100.0
Democratic hold			

== District 12 ==
2016 California's 12th congressional district election
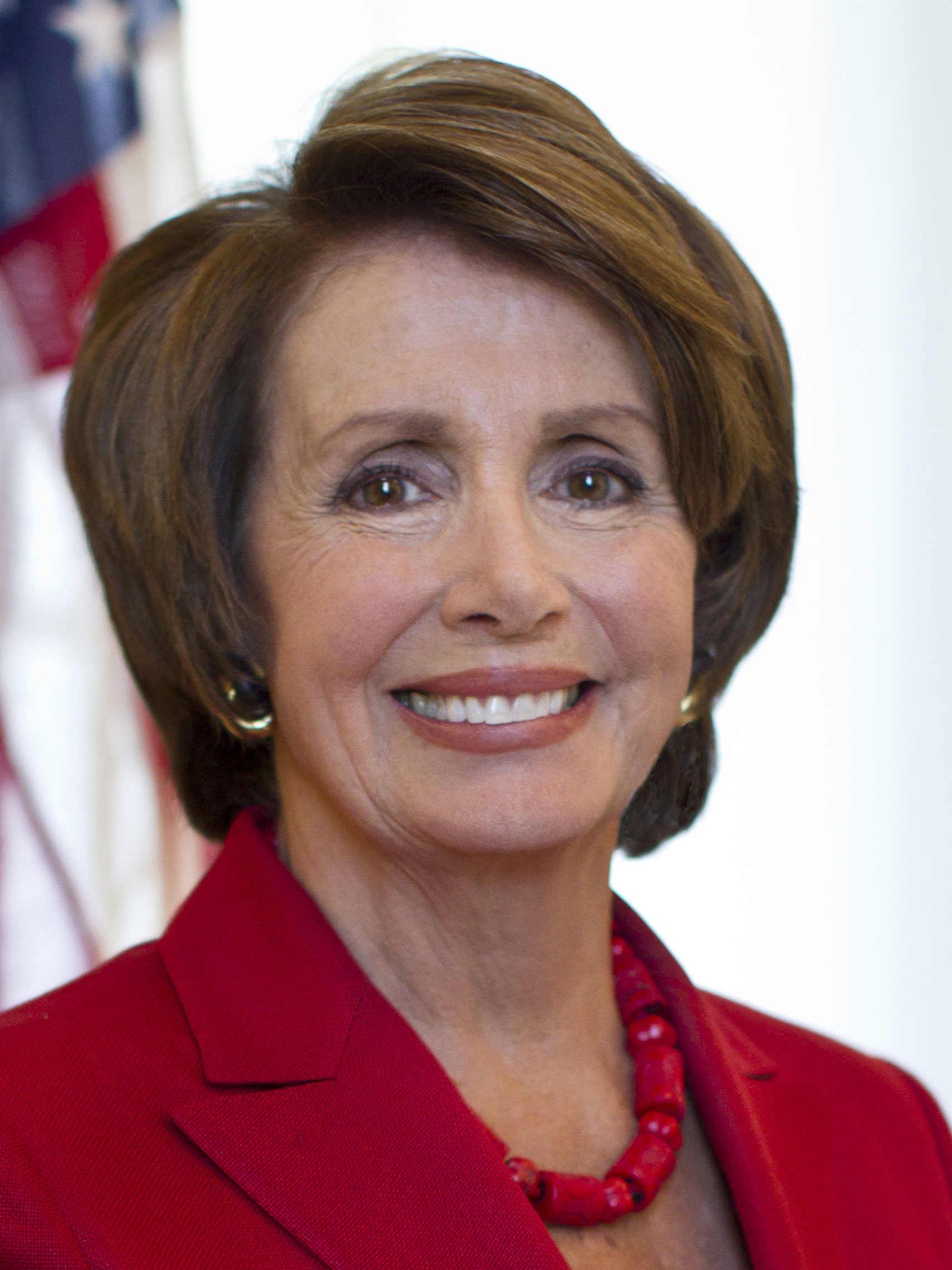

Nominee	Nancy Pelosi	Preston Picus
Party	Democratic	No party preference
Popular vote	274,035	64,810
Percentage	80.9%	19.1%
- County results Pelosi: 80–90%
U.S. Representative before election
Nancy Pelosi
Democratic
Elected U.S. Representative
Nancy Pelosi
Democratic

The 12th district is based in the Bay Area and includes most of San Francisco. Incumbent Democrat Nancy Pelosi, who had represented the 12th district since 2013 and previously represented the 8th district from 1993 to 2013 and the 5th district from 1987 until 1993, ran for re-election.

=== Primary election ===
==== Democratic candidates ====
===== Advanced to general =====
- Nancy Pelosi, incumbent U.S. Representative

==== Republican candidates ====
===== Eliminated in primary =====
- Bob Miller, retired electrician

==== Green candidates ====
===== Eliminated in primary =====
- Barry Hermanson, retired entrepreneur and candidate for this seat in 2012 & 2014

==== Independent candidates ====
===== Advanced to general =====
- Preston Picus, teacher, author and coach

==== Endorsements ====
Nancy Pelosi (D)

Labor unions

- AFL-CIO

Organizations

- California Democratic Party

==== Results ====
Nonpartisan blanket primary results
Party	Candidate	Votes	%
Democratic	Nancy Pelosi (incumbent)	169,537	78.1
No party preference	Preston Picus	16,633	7.7
Republican	Bob Miller	16,583	7.6
Green	Barry Hermanson	14,289	6.6
Total votes		217,042	100.0

=== General election ===
==== Predictions ====
Source	Ranking	As of
The Cook Political Report	Safe D	November 7, 2016
Daily Kos Elections	Safe D	November 7, 2016
Rothenberg	Safe D	November 3, 2016
Sabato's Crystal Ball	Safe D	November 7, 2016
RCP	Safe D	October 31, 2016

==== Endorsements ====
Nancy Pelosi (D)

Labor unions

- AFL-CIO
- Communications Workers of America
- International Brotherhood of Boilermakers

Organizations

- Equality California

==== Results ====
California's 12th congressional district election, 2016
Party	Candidate	Votes	%
Democratic	Nancy Pelosi (incumbent)	274,035	80.9
No party preference	Preston Picus	64,810	19.1
Total votes		338,845	100.0
Democratic hold			

== District 13 ==
2016 California's 13th congressional district election
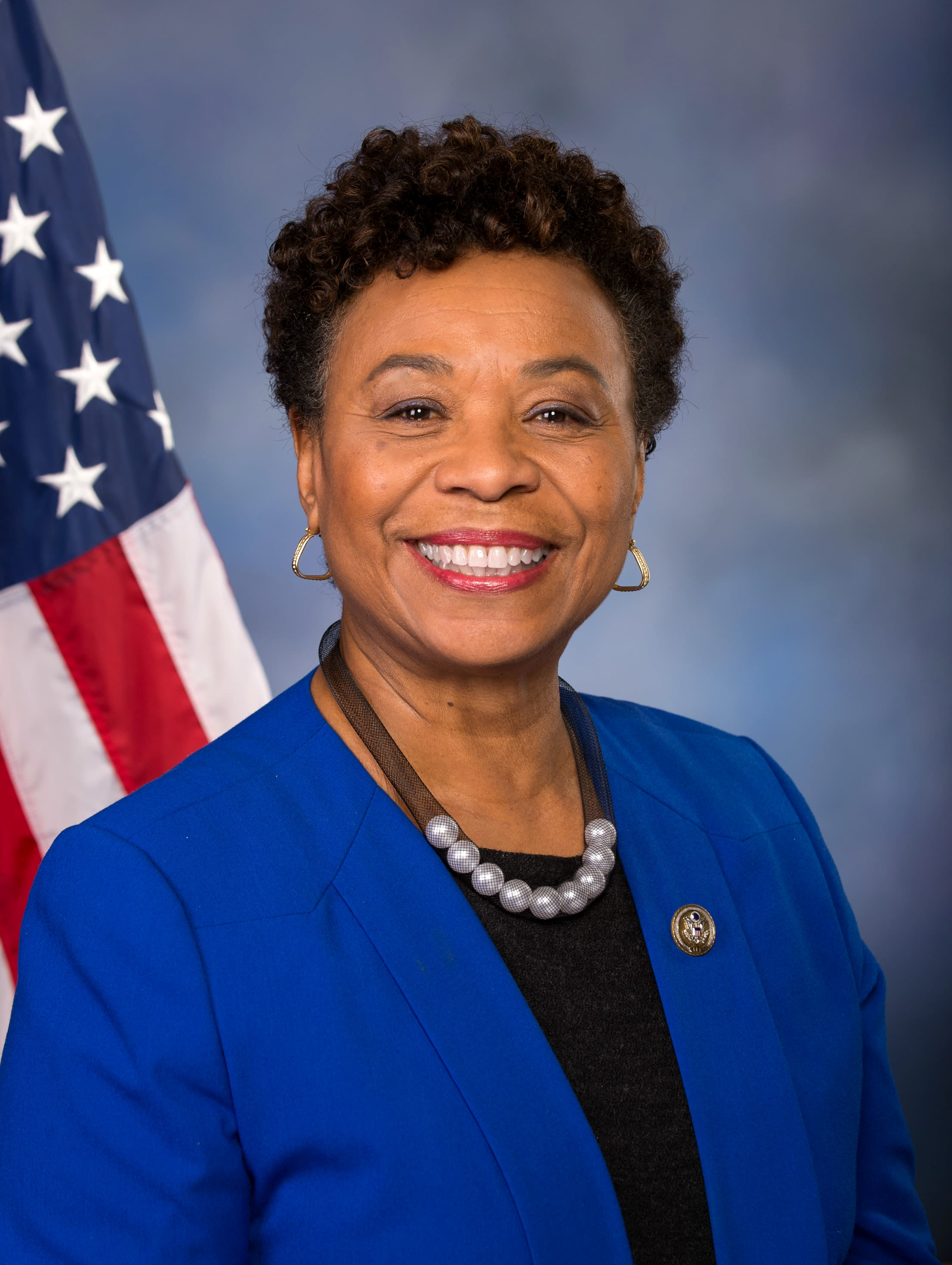

Nominee	Barbara Lee	Sue Caro
Party	Democratic	Republican
Popular vote	192,227	16,818
Percentage	92.0%	8.0%
U.S. Representative before election
Barbara Lee
Democratic
Elected U.S. Representative
Barbara Lee
Democratic

The 13th district is based in the East Bay and includes Berkeley and Oakland. Incumbent Democrat Barbara Lee, who had represented the 13th district since 2013 and previously represented the 9th district from 1998 to 2013, ran for re-election.

=== Primary election ===
==== Democratic candidates ====
===== Advanced to general =====
- Barbara Lee, incumbent U.S. Representative

==== Republican candidates ====
===== Advanced to general =====
- Sue Caro, retired realtor

==== Endorsements ====
Barbara Lee (D)

Labor unions

- AFL-CIO
- Service Employees International Union

Organizations

- California Democratic Party

==== Results ====
Nonpartisan blanket primary results
Party	Candidate	Votes	%
Democratic	Barbara Lee (incumbent)	192,227	92.0
Republican	Sue Caro	16,818	8.0
Total votes		209,045	100.0

=== General election ===
==== Predictions ====
Source	Ranking	As of
The Cook Political Report	Safe D	November 7, 2016
Daily Kos Elections	Safe D	November 7, 2016
Rothenberg	Safe D	November 3, 2016
Sabato's Crystal Ball	Safe D	November 7, 2016
RCP	Safe D	October 31, 2016

==== Endorsements ====
Barbara Lee (D)

Labor unions

- AFL-CIO
- Communications Workers of America
- International Brotherhood of Boilermakers
- Service Employees International Union

Organizations

- Equality California
- Progressive Democrats of America

==== Results ====
California's 13th congressional district election, 2016
Party	Candidate	Votes	%
Democratic	Barbara Lee (incumbent)	293,117	90.8
Republican	Sue Caro	29,754	9.2
Total votes		322,871	100.0
Democratic hold			

== District 14 ==
2016 California's 14th congressional district election
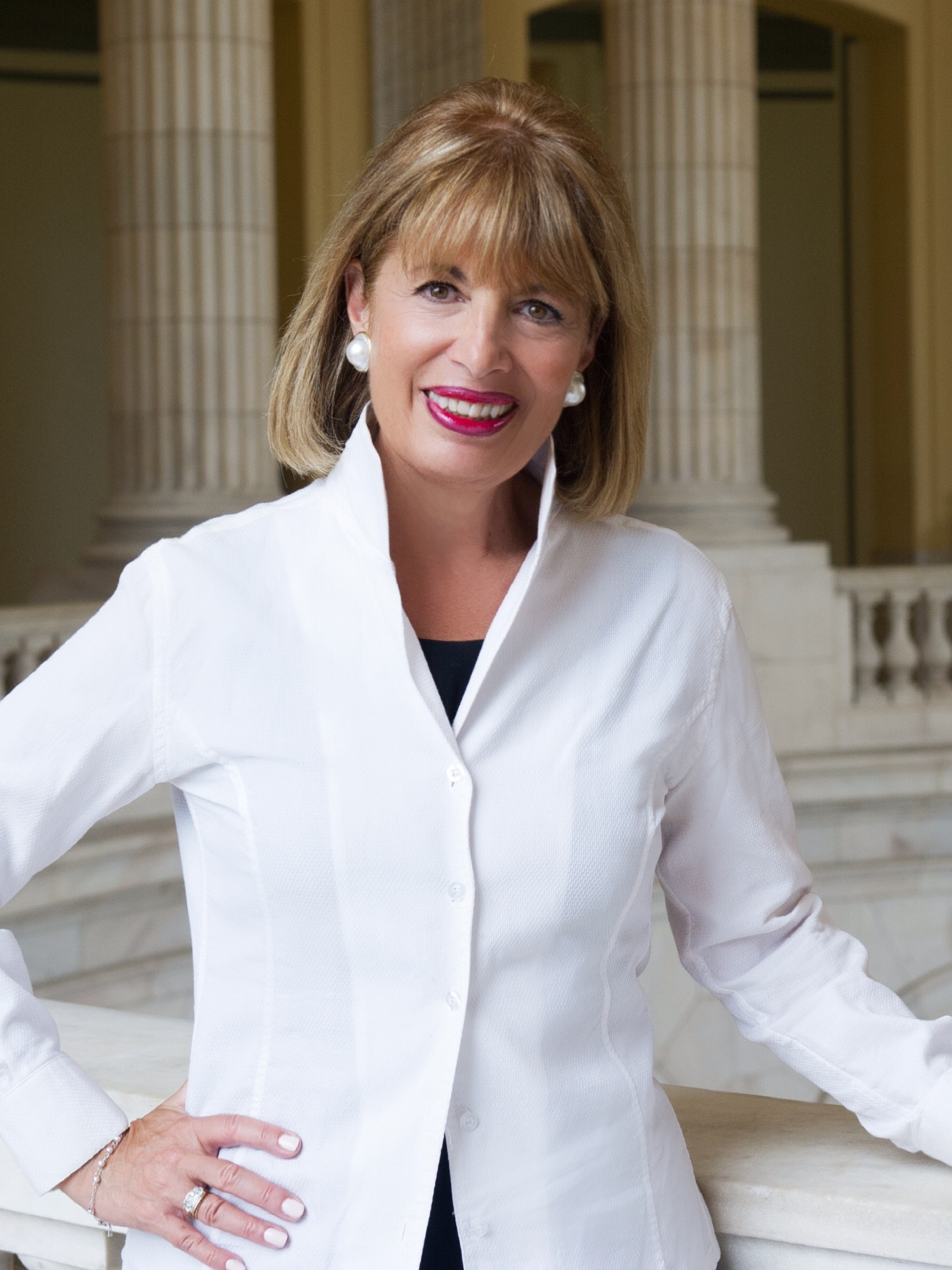

Nominee	Jackie Speier	Angel Cardenas
Party	Democratic	Republican
Popular vote	231,630	54,817
Percentage	80.9%	19.1%
- County results Speier: 80–90%
U.S. Representative before election
Jackie Speier
Democratic
Elected U.S. Representative
Jackie Speier
Democratic

The 14th district is based in the Bay Area and includes most of San Mateo County. Incumbent Democrat Jackie Speier, who had represented the 14th district since 2013 and previously represented the 12th district from 2008 to 2013, ran for re-election.

=== Primary election ===
==== Democratic candidates ====
===== Advanced to general =====
- Jackie Speier, incumbent U.S. Representative

==== Republican candidates ====
===== Advanced to general =====
- Angel Cardenas

==== Endorsements ====
Jackie Speier (D)

Labor unions

- AFL-CIO
- Service Employees International Union

Organizations

- California Democratic Party

==== Results ====
Nonpartisan blanket primary results
Party	Candidate	Votes	%
Democratic	Jackie Speier (incumbent)	144,719	99.0
Republican	Angel Cardenas (write-in)	1,400	1.0
Total votes		146,119	100.0

=== General election ===
==== Predictions ====
Source	Ranking	As of
The Cook Political Report	Safe D	November 7, 2016
Daily Kos Elections	Safe D	November 7, 2016
Rothenberg	Safe D	November 3, 2016
Sabato's Crystal Ball	Safe D	November 7, 2016
RCP	Safe D	October 31, 2016

==== Endorsements ====
Jackie Speier (D)

Labor unions

- AFL-CIO
- International Brotherhood of Boilermakers

Organizations

- Equality California

==== Results ====
California's 14th congressional district election, 2016
Party	Candidate	Votes	%
Democratic	Jackie Speier (incumbent)	231,630	80.9
Republican	Angel Cardenas	54,817	19.1
Total votes		286,447	100.0
Democratic hold			

== District 15 ==
2016 California's 15th congressional district election
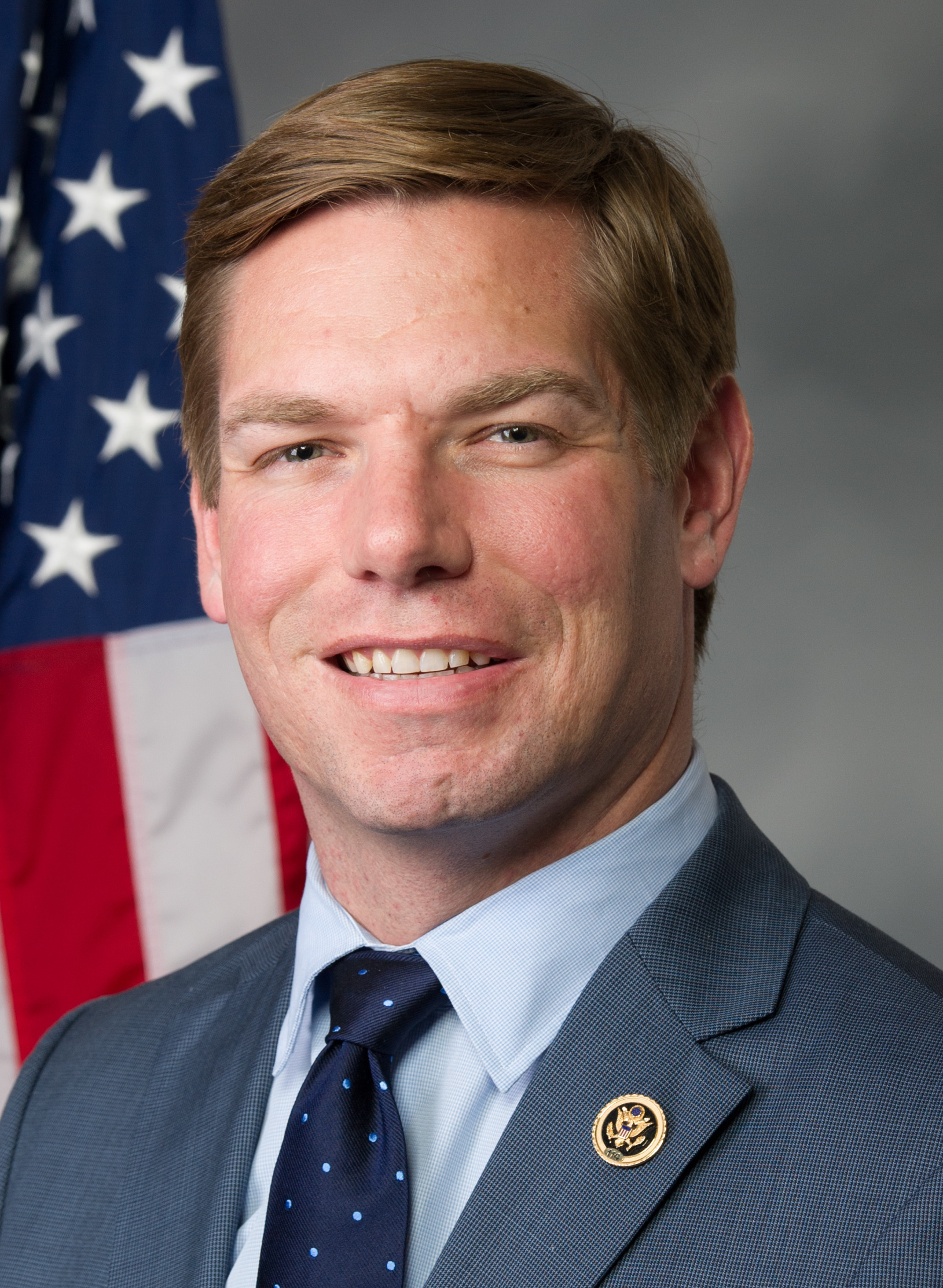

Nominee	Eric Swalwell	Danny R. Turner
Party	Democratic	Republican
Popular vote	198,578	70,619
Percentage	73.8%	26.8%
- County results Swalwell: 60–70% 70–80%
U.S. Representative before election
Eric Swalwell
Democratic
Elected U.S. Representative
Eric Swalwell
Democratic

The 15th district is based in the East Bay and includes Hayward and Livermore. Incumbent Democrat Eric Swalwell, who had represented the 15th district since 2013, ran for re-election.

=== Primary election ===
==== Democratic candidates ====
===== Advanced to general =====
- Eric Swalwell, incumbent U.S. Representative

==== Republican candidates ====
===== Advanced to general =====
- Danny R. Turner, businessman

==== Endorsements ====
Eric Swalwell (D)

Labor unions

- AFL-CIO

Organizations

- California Democratic Party

==== Results ====
Nonpartisan blanket primary results
Party	Candidate	Votes	%
Democratic	Eric Swalwell (incumbent)	110,803	76.5
Republican	Danny R. Turner	34,032	23.5
Total votes		144,835	100.0

=== General election ===
==== Predictions ====
Source	Ranking	As of
The Cook Political Report	Safe D	November 7, 2016
Daily Kos Elections	Safe D	November 7, 2016
Rothenberg	Safe D	November 3, 2016
Sabato's Crystal Ball	Safe D	November 7, 2016
RCP	Safe D	October 31, 2016

==== Endorsements ====
Eric Swalwell (D)

Labor unions

- AFL-CIO
- International Brotherhood of Boilermakers

Organizations

- End Citizens United
- Equality California

==== Results ====
California's 15th congressional district election, 2016
Party	Candidate	Votes	%
Democratic	Eric Swalwell (incumbent)	198,578	73.8
Republican	Danny R. Turner	70,619	26.2
Total votes		269,197	100.0
Democratic hold			

== District 16 ==
2016 California's 16th congressional district election
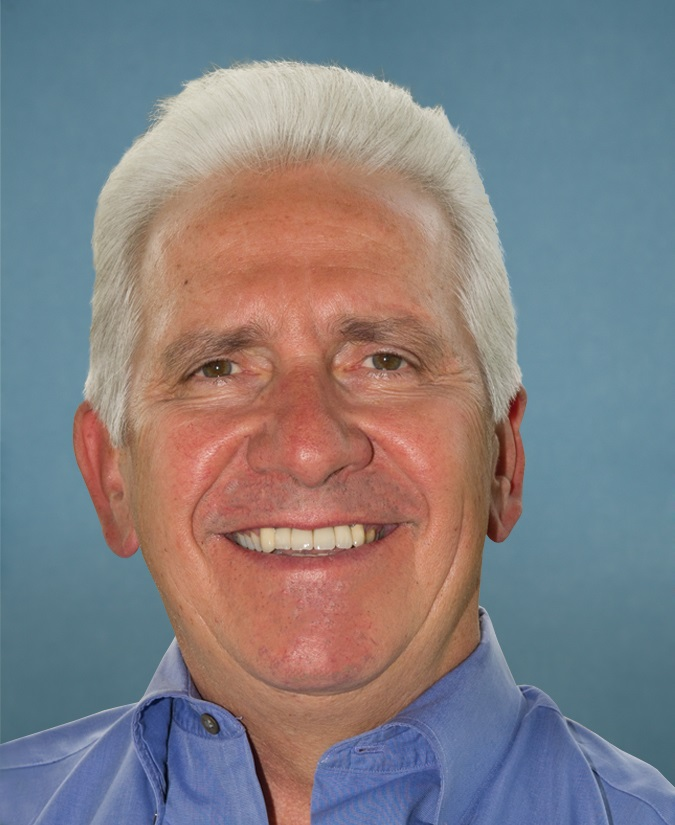

Nominee	Jim Costa	Johnny Tacherra
Party	Democratic	Republican
Popular vote	97,473	70,483
Percentage	58.0%	42.0%
- County results Costa: 50–60% 60–70% Tacherra: 50–60%
U.S. Representative before election
Jim Costa
Democratic
Elected U.S. Representative
Jim Costa
Democratic

The 16th district is based in the Central Valley and includes Fresno and Merced. Incumbent Democrat Jim Costa, who had represented the 16th district since 2013 and previously represented the 20th district from 2005 to 2013, ran for re-election.

=== Primary election ===
==== Democratic candidates ====
===== Advanced to general =====
- Jim Costa, incumbent U.S. Representative

==== Republican candidates ====
===== Advanced to general =====
- Johnny M. Tacherra, farmer, candidate for this seat in 2012 and general election candidate for this seat in 2014

===== Eliminated in primary =====
- David Rogers, small businessman

==== Green candidates ====
===== Eliminated in primary =====
- Richard Gomez

==== Endorsements ====
Jim Costa (D)

Organizations

- California Democratic Party

==== Results ====
Nonpartisan blanket primary results
Party	Candidate	Votes	%
Democratic	Jim Costa (incumbent)	52,822	55.9
Republican	Johnny M. Tacherra	31,028	32.8
Republican	David Rogers	10,606	11.2
Green	Richard Gomez (write-in)	13	0.0
Total votes		94,469	100.0

=== General election ===
==== Predictions ====
Source	Ranking	As of
The Cook Political Report	Safe D	November 7, 2016
Daily Kos Elections	Safe D	November 7, 2016
Rothenberg	Safe D	November 3, 2016
Sabato's Crystal Ball	Safe D	November 7, 2016
RCP	Likely D	October 31, 2016

==== Endorsements ====
Jim Costa (D)

Organizations

- Blue Dog Coalition
- End Citizens United

==== Results ====
California's 16th congressional district election, 2016
Party	Candidate	Votes	%
Democratic	Jim Costa (incumbent)	97,473	58.0
Republican	Johnny M. Tacherra	70,483	42.0
Total votes		167,956	100.0
Democratic hold			

== District 17 ==
2016 California's 17th congressional district election
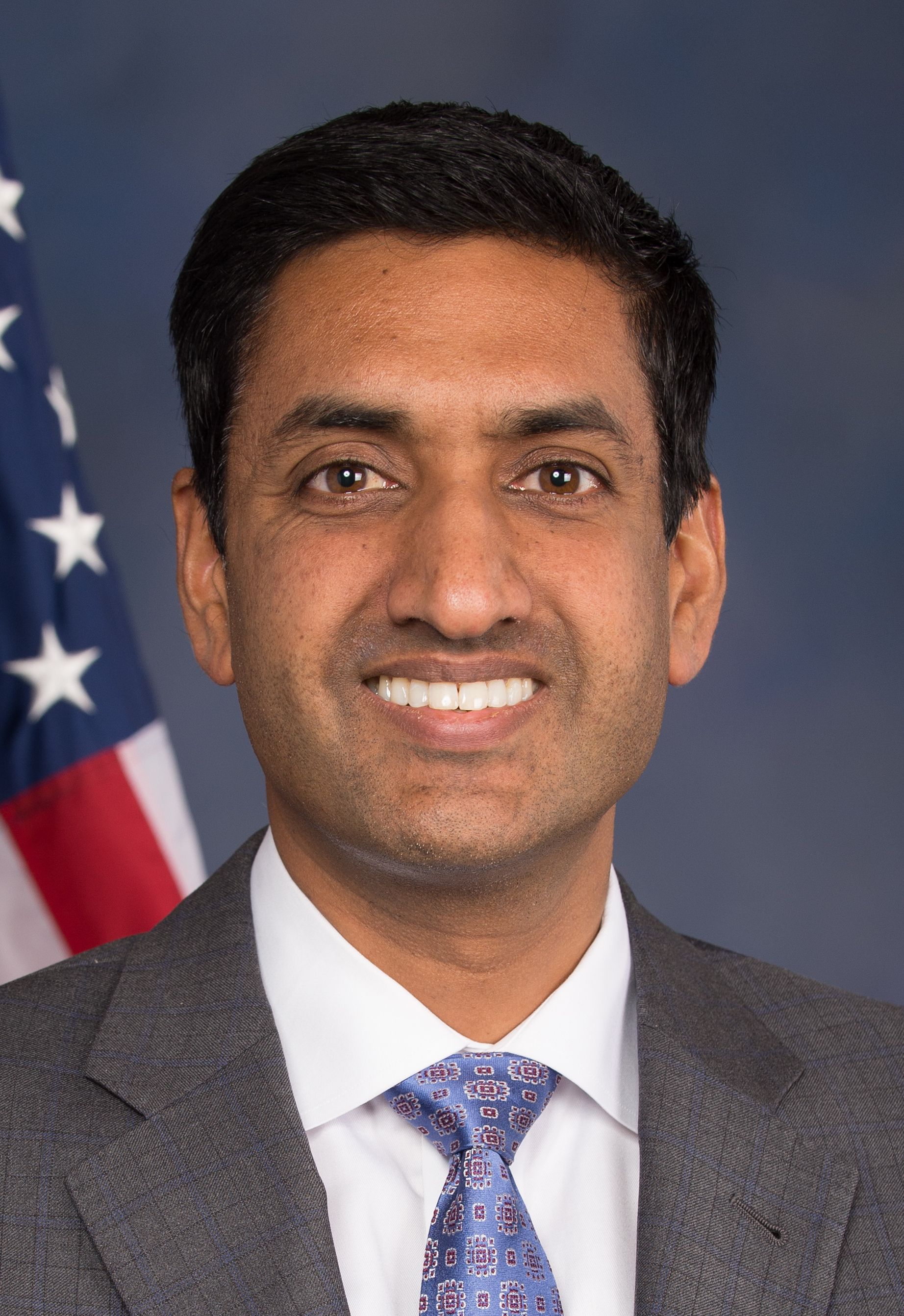

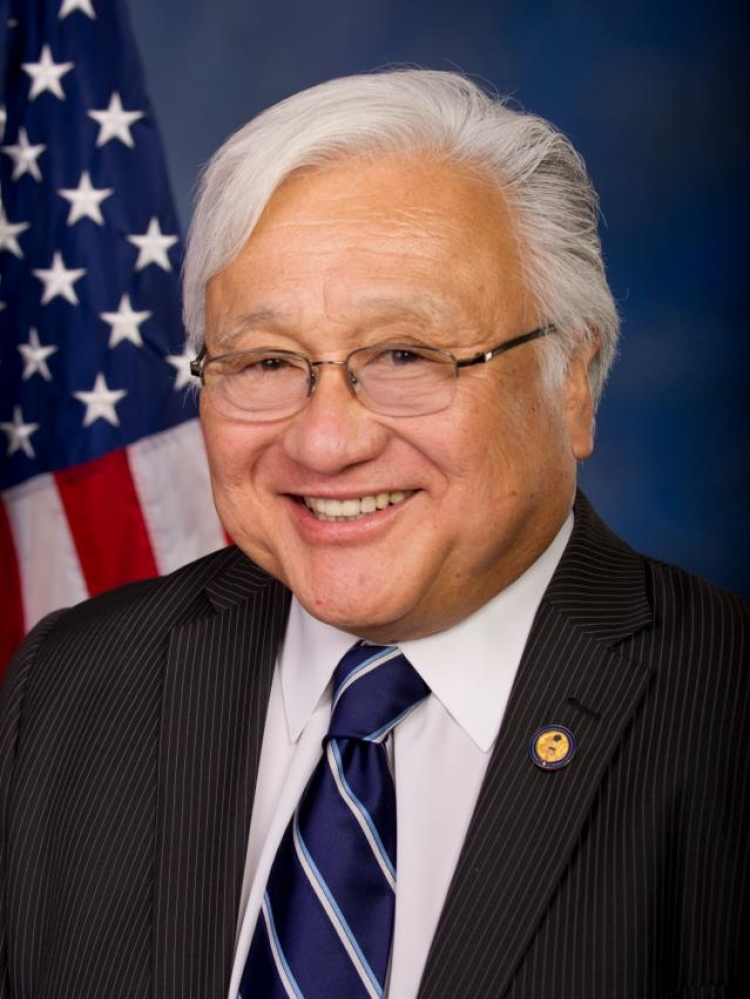
Nominee	Ro Khanna	Mike Honda
Party	Democratic	Democratic
Popular vote	142,268	90,924
Percentage	61.0%	39.0%
U.S. Representative before election
Mike Honda
Democratic
Elected U.S. Representative
Ro Khanna
Democratic

The 17th district is based in the Bay Area and includes Sunnyvale, Cupertino, Santa Clara, Fremont, and Milpitas. Incumbent Democrat Mike Honda, who had represented the 17th district since 2013 and previously represented the 15th district from 2001 to 2013, ran for re-election.

=== Primary election ===
==== Democratic candidates ====
===== Advanced to general =====
- Mike Honda, incumbent U.S. Representative
- Ro Khanna, former Deputy Assistant Secretary in the United States Department of Commerce, candidate for the 12th district in 2004 and general election candidate for this seat in 2014

===== Eliminated in primary =====
- Pierluigi Oliverio, San Jose City Council member

==== Republican candidates ====
===== Eliminated in primary =====
- Ron Cohen, certified public accountant
- Peter Kuo, small business owner

==== Libertarian candidates ====
===== Eliminated in primary =====
- Kennita Watson, retired quality engineer

==== Campaign ====
Khanna took no donations from PACs or corporations for his 2016 campaign, raising $480,500 from individuals associated with the securities and investment industries and $170,752 from individuals associated with the electronics manufacturing industry. All these donations were subject to the $2,700 individual contributions cap.

==== Endorsements ====
Mike Honda (D)

U.S. Senators

- Barbara Boxer, U.S. Senator (D-CA)
- Dianne Feinstein, U.S. Senator (D-CA)

U.S. Representatives

- Ami Bera, U.S. Representative (CA-7)
- Jared Huffman, U.S. Representative (CA-2)
- Barbara Lee, U.S. Representative (CA-13)
- Zoe Lofgren, U.S. Representative (CA-19)
- Jerry McNerney, U.S. Representative (CA-9)
- Nancy Pelosi, U.S. Representative (CA-12) and former Speaker of the House

State officials

- John Chiang, State Treasurer
- Kamala Harris, State Attorney General
- Dave Jones, Insurance Commissioner of California
- Tom Torlakson, Superintendent of Public Instruction
- Betty Yee, California State Controller

Labor unions

- AFL-CIO
- Communications Workers of America
- International Brotherhood of Boilermakers
- Service Employees International Union

Organizations

- California Democratic Party
- Equality California
- Progressive Change Campaign Committee
Ro Khanna (D)

U.S. Executive Branch officials

- Jimmy Carter, 39th President of the United States

State officials

- Gavin Newsom, Lieutenant Governor of California
- Alex Padilla, Secretary of State of California

State legislators

- Kevin de León, President pro tempore of the California State Senate

Labor unions

- Laborers' International Union of North America

==== Polling ====
Poll source	Date(s) administered	Sample size	Margin of error	Mike Honda (D)	Ro Khanna (D)	Pierluigi Oliverio (D)	Ron Cohen (R)	Peter Kuo (R)	Kennita Watson (L)	Undecided
SurveyUSA	May 18–23, 2016	564	± 4.2%	31%	25%	2%	7%	5%	2%	29%

==== Results ====
Nonpartisan blanket primary results
Party	Candidate	Votes	%
Democratic	Ro Khanna	52,059	39.1
Democratic	Mike Honda (incumbent)	49,823	37.4
Republican	Peter Kuo	12,224	9.2
Republican	Ron Cohen	10,448	7.8
Democratic	Pierluigi Oliverio	5,533	4.2
Libertarian	Kennita Watson	3,125	2.3
Total votes		133,212	100.0

=== General election ===
==== Predictions ====
Source	Ranking	As of
The Cook Political Report	Safe D	November 7, 2016
Daily Kos Elections	Safe D	November 7, 2016
Rothenberg	Safe D	November 3, 2016
Sabato's Crystal Ball	Safe D	November 7, 2016
RCP	Safe D	October 31, 2016

==== Polling ====
Poll source	Date(s) administered	Sample size	Margin of error	Mike Honda (D)	Ro Khanna (D)	Undecided
SurveyUSA	October 4–7, 2016	550	4.3%	37%	38%	26%

==== Results ====
California's 17th congressional district election, 2016
Party	Candidate	Votes	%
Democratic	Ro Khanna	142,268	61.0
Democratic	Mike Honda (incumbent)	90,924	39.0
Total votes		233,192	100.0
Democratic hold			

== District 18 ==
2016 California's 18th congressional district election
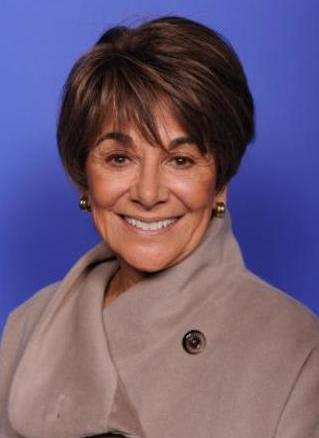

Nominee	Anna Eshoo	Richard B. Fox
Party	Democratic	Republican
Popular vote	230,460	93,470
Percentage	71.1%	28.9%
- County results Eshoo: 70–80%
U.S. Representative before election
Anna Eshoo
Democratic
Elected U.S. Representative
Anna Eshoo
Democratic

The 18th district is based in the Bay Area and includes Palo Alto, Redwood City, and Saratoga. Incumbent Democrat Anna Eshoo, who had represented the 18th district since 2013 and previously represented the 14th district from 1993 to 2013, ran for re-election.

=== Primary election ===
==== Democratic candidates ====
===== Advanced to general =====
- Anna Eshoo, incumbent U.S. Representative

===== Eliminated in primary =====
- Bob Harlow

==== Republican candidates ====
===== Advanced to general =====
- Richard B. Fox, physician and attorney

==== Endorsements ====
Anna Eshoo (D)

Labor unions

- AFL-CIO

Organizations

- California Democratic Party

==== Results ====
Nonpartisan blanket primary results
Party	Candidate	Votes	%
Democratic	Anna Eshoo (incumbent)	132,726	68.2
Republican	Richard B. Fox	47,484	24.4
Democratic	Bob Harlow	14,411	7.4
Total votes		194,621	100.0

=== General election ===
==== Predictions ====
Source	Ranking	As of
The Cook Political Report	Safe D	November 7, 2016
Daily Kos Elections	Safe D	November 7, 2016
Rothenberg	Safe D	November 3, 2016
Sabato's Crystal Ball	Safe D	November 7, 2016
RCP	Safe D	October 31, 2016

==== Endorsements ====
Anna Eshoo (D)

Labor unions

- AFL-CIO
- International Brotherhood of Boilermakers

Organizations

- Equality California

==== Results ====
California's 18th congressional district election, 2016
Party	Candidate	Votes	%
Democratic	Anna Eshoo (incumbent)	230,460	71.1
Republican	Richard B. Fox	93,470	28.9
Total votes		323,930	100.0
Democratic hold			

== District 19 ==
2016 California's 19th congressional district election
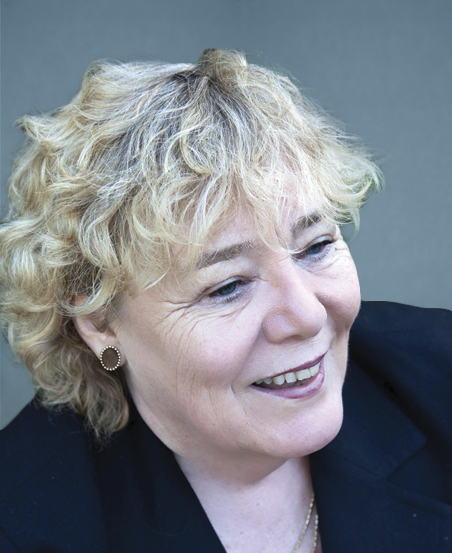

Nominee	Zoe Lofgren	G. Burt Lancaster
Party	Democratic	Republican
Popular vote	181,802	64,061
Percentage	73.9%	26.1%
- County results Lofgren: 70–80%
U.S. Representative before election
Zoe Lofgren
Democratic
Elected U.S. Representative
Zoe Lofgren
Democratic

The 19th district is based in the South Bay and includes most of San Jose. Incumbent Democrat Zoe Lofgren, who had represented the 19th district since 2013 and previously represented the 16th district from 1995 to 2013, ran for re-election.

=== Primary election ===
==== Democratic candidates ====
===== Advanced to general =====
- Zoe Lofgren, incumbent U.S. Representative

==== Republican candidates ====
===== Advanced to general =====
- G. Burt Lancaster, economic technology consultant

==== Endorsements ====
Zoe Lofgren (D)

Labor unions

- AFL-CIO

Organizations

- California Democratic Party

==== Results ====
Nonpartisan blanket primary results
Party	Candidate	Votes	%
Democratic	Zoe Lofgren (incumbent)	107,773	76.1
Republican	G. Burt Lancaster	33,889	23.9
Total votes		194,251	100.0

=== General election ===
==== Predictions ====
Source	Ranking	As of
The Cook Political Report	Safe D	November 7, 2016
Daily Kos Elections	Safe D	November 7, 2016
Rothenberg	Safe D	November 3, 2016
Sabato's Crystal Ball	Safe D	November 7, 2016
RCP	Safe D	October 31, 2016

==== Endorsements ====
Zoe Lofgren (D)

Labor unions

- AFL-CIO
- Communications Workers of America
- International Brotherhood of Boilermakers

Organizations

- Equality California

==== Results ====
California's 19th congressional district election, 2016
Party	Candidate	Votes	%
Democratic	Zoe Lofgren (incumbent)	181,802	73.9
Republican	G. Burt Lancaster	64,061	26.1
Total votes		245,863	100.0
Democratic hold			

== District 20 ==
2016 California's 20th congressional district election
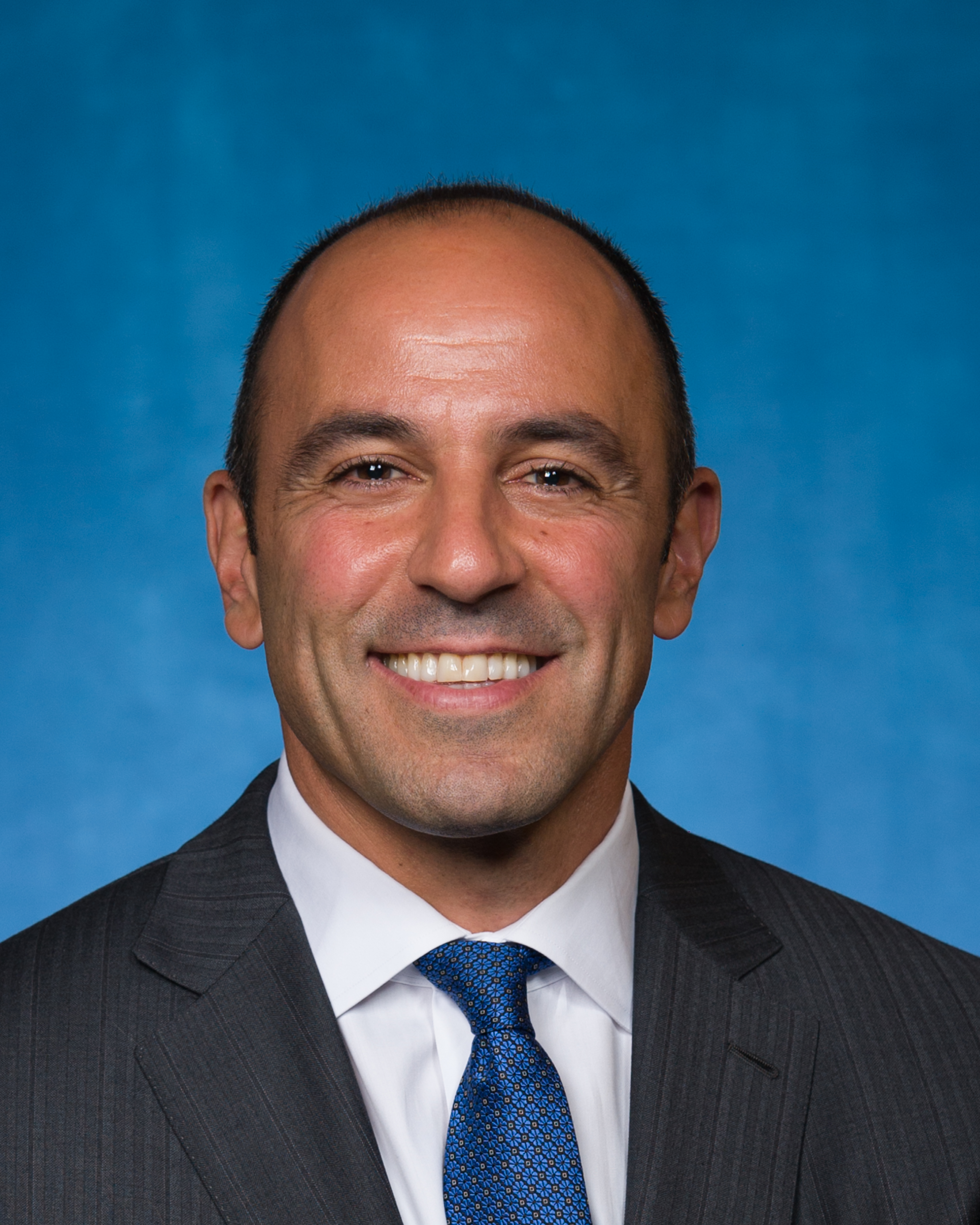

Nominee	Jimmy Panetta	Casey Lucius
Party	Democratic	Republican
Popular vote	180,980	74,811
Percentage	70.8%	29.2%
- County results Panetta: 50–60% 60–70% 70–80%
U.S. Representative before election
Sam Farr
Democratic
Elected U.S. Representative
Jimmy Panetta
Democratic

The 20th district is based in the Central Coast and includes Monterey and Santa Cruz. Incumbent Democrat Sam Farr, who had represented the 20th district since 2013 and previously represented the 17th district from 1993 to 2013, retired.

=== Primary election ===
==== Democratic candidates ====
===== Advanced to general =====
- Jimmy Panetta, Monterey County Deputy District Attorney and son of Leon Panetta

===== Declined =====
- Sam Farr, incumbent U.S. Representative

==== Republican candidates ====
===== Advanced to general =====
- Casey Lucius, Pacific Grove Council member and national security professor

==== Peace and Freedom candidates ====
===== Eliminated in primary =====
- Joe Williams, hospital laboratory technician

==== Independent candidates ====
===== Eliminated in primary =====
- Jack Digby, ironworker
- Barbara Honegger, investigative journalist and author

===== Withdrawn =====
- Matt Bruner

==== Endorsements ====
Jimmy Panetta (D)

Labor unions

- AFL-CIO
- Service Employees International Union

Organizations

- California Democratic Party
- Equality California

==== Results ====
Nonpartisan blanket primary results
Party	Candidate	Votes	%
Democratic	Jimmy Panetta	116,826	70.8
Republican	Casey Lucius	32,726	19.8
Peace and Freedom	Joe Williams	6,400	3.9
No party preference	Barbara Honegger	6,054	3.7
No party preference	Jack Digby	2,932	1.8
Total votes		164,938	100.0

=== General election ===
==== Predictions ====
Source	Ranking	As of
The Cook Political Report	Safe D	November 7, 2016
Daily Kos Elections	Safe D	November 7, 2016
Rothenberg	Safe D	November 3, 2016
Sabato's Crystal Ball	Safe D	November 7, 2016
RCP	Safe D	October 31, 2016

==== Endorsements ====
Jimmy Panetta (D)

Labor unions

- AFL-CIO
- International Brotherhood of Boilermakers
- Service Employees International Union

Organizations

- Equality California
- VoteVets

==== Results ====
California's 20th congressional district election, 2016
Party	Candidate	Votes	%
Democratic	Jimmy Panetta	180,980	70.8
Republican	Casey Lucius	74,811	29.2
Total votes		255,791	100.0
Democratic hold			

== District 21 ==
2016 California's 21st congressional district election
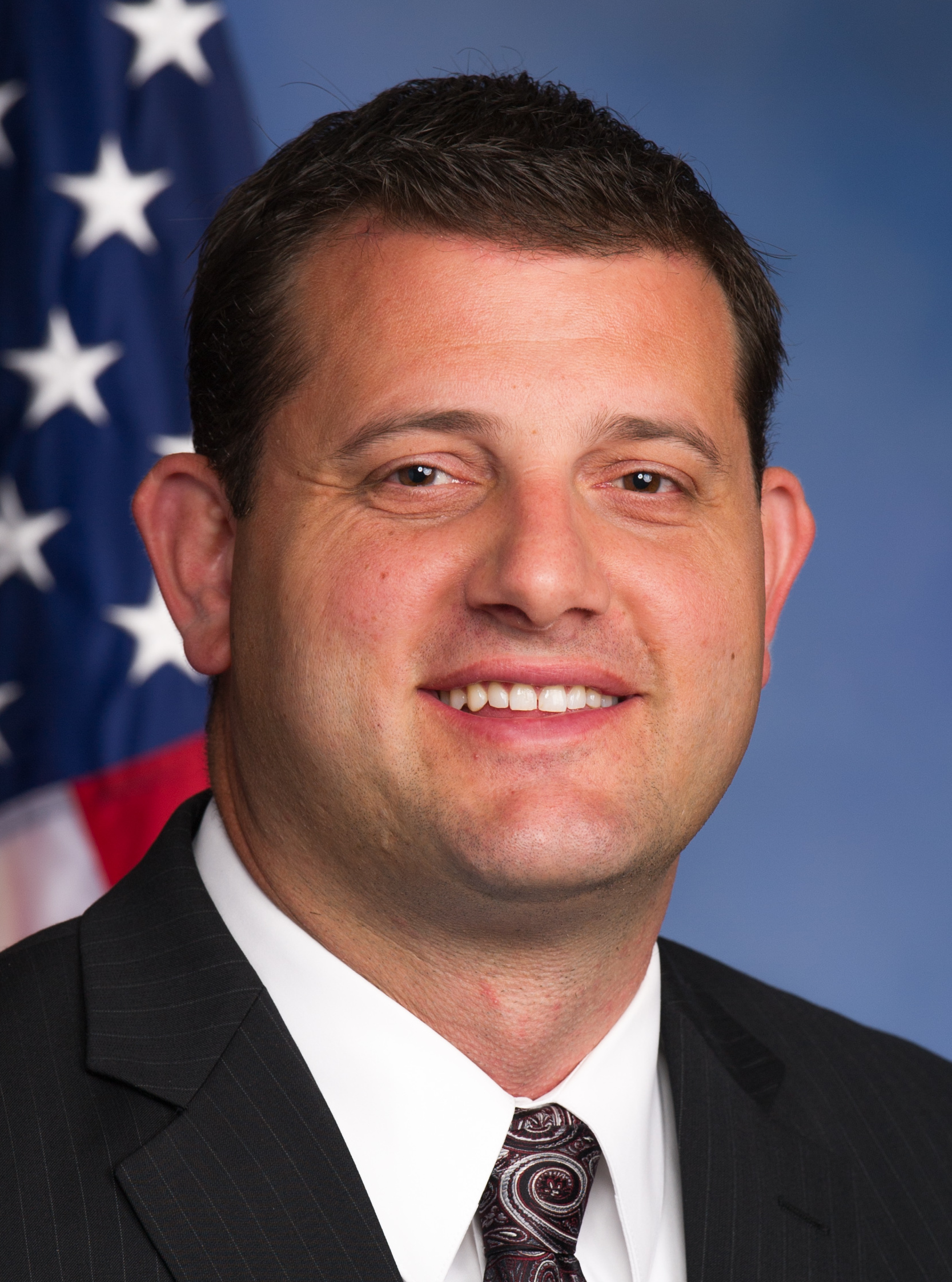

Nominee	David Valadao	Emilio Huerta
Party	Republican	Democratic
Popular vote	75,126	57,282
Percentage	56.7%	43.3%
- County results Valadao: 50–60% 70–80% Huerta: 50–60%
U.S. Representative before election
David Valadao
Republican
Elected U.S. Representative
David Valadao
Republican

The 21st district is based in the Central Valley and includes Hanford and parts of Bakersfield. Incumbent Republican David Valadao, who had represented the 21st district since 2013, ran for re-election.

=== Primary election ===
==== Republican candidates ====
===== Advanced to general =====
- David Valadao, incumbent U.S. Representative

==== Democratic candidates ====
===== Advanced to general =====
- Emilio Huerta, civil rights attorney and son of Dolores Huerta

===== Eliminated in primary =====
- Daniel Parra, Fowler Mayor Pro Tem and defense analyst

===== Withdrawn =====
- Connie Perez, accountant

===== Declined =====
- Amanda Renteria, former chief of staff for Senator Debbie Stabenow and general election candidate for this seat in 2014

==== Endorsements ====
Emilio Huerta (D)

Labor unions

- AFL-CIO (joint with Parra)
Daniel Parra (D)

Labor unions

- AFL-CIO (joint with Huerta)

==== Results ====
Nonpartisan blanket primary results
Party	Candidate	Votes	%
Republican	David Valadao (incumbent)	37,367	54.0
Democratic	Emilio Huerta	16,743	24.2
Democratic	Daniel Parra	15,056	21.8
Total votes		69,166	100.0

=== General election ===
==== Endorsements ====
David Valadao (R)

Organizations

- BIPAC
- National Republican Congressional Committee "Patriot" Program
Emilio Huerta (D)

Labor unions

- AFL-CIO
- International Brotherhood of Boilermakers
- Service Employees International Union

Organizations

- Democratic Congressional Campaign Committee "Red to Blue" Program
- Equality California
- Progressive Democrats of America

==== Debate ====
2016 California's 21st congressional district debate
No.	Date	Host	Moderator	Link	Republican	Democratic
Key: P Participant A Absent N Not invited I Invited W Withdrawn						
Key: P Participant A Absent N Not invited I Invited W Withdrawn					David Valadao	Emilio Huerta
1	October 20, 2016	KGET-TV	Evan Onstot; Jim Scott		P	P

==== Predictions ====
Source	Ranking	As of
The Cook Political Report	Lean R	November 7, 2016
Daily Kos Elections	Lean R	November 7, 2016
Rothenberg	Likely R	November 3, 2016
Sabato's Crystal Ball	Lean R	November 7, 2016
RCP	Likely R	October 31, 2016

==== Results ====
California's 21st congressional district election, 2016
Party	Candidate	Votes	%
Republican	David Valadao (incumbent)	75,126	56.7
Democratic	Emilio Huerta	57,282	43.3
Total votes		132,408	100.0
Republican hold			

== District 22 ==
2016 California's 22nd congressional district election
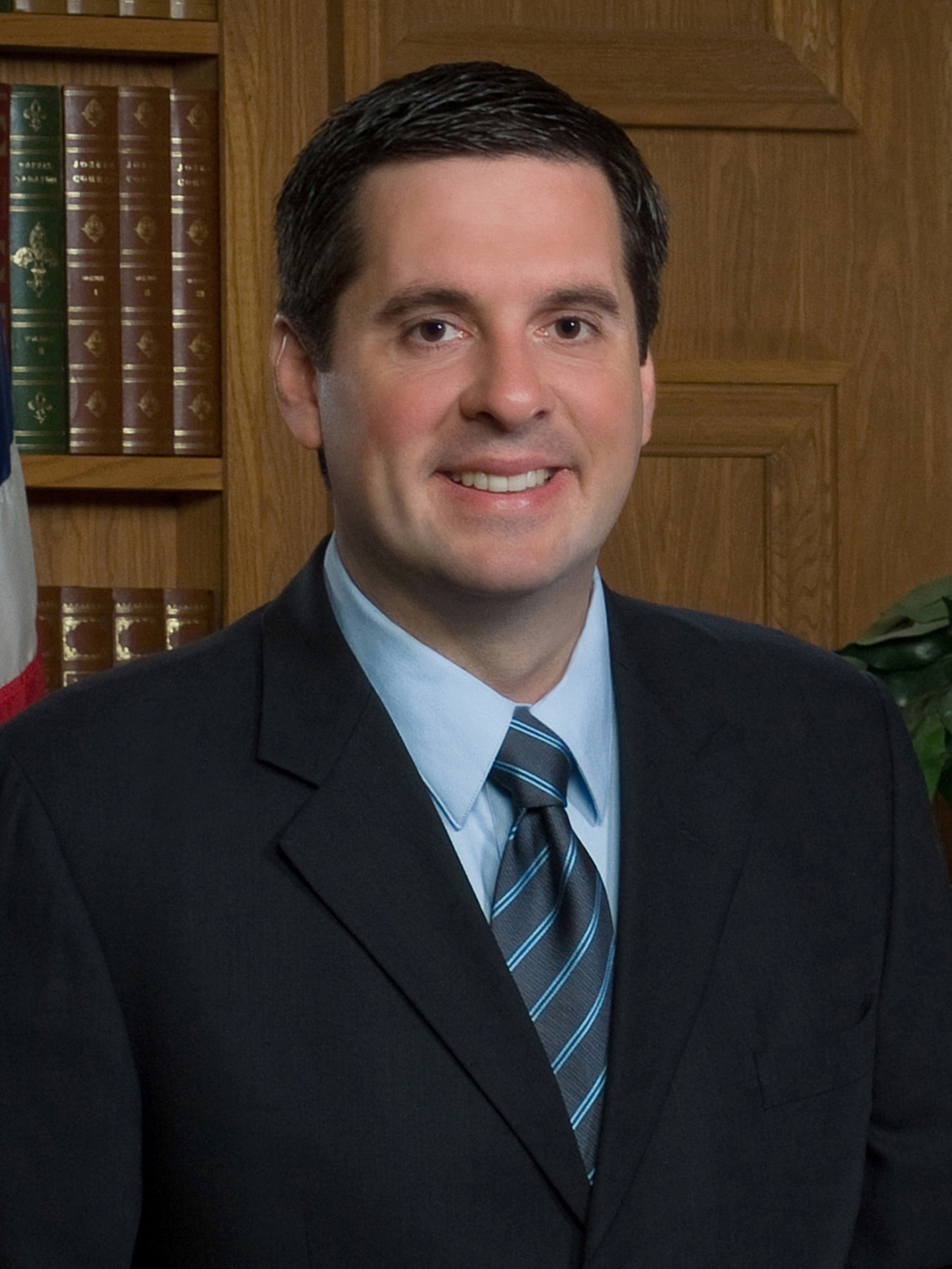

Nominee	Devin Nunes	Louie Campos
Party	Republican	Democratic
Popular vote	158,755	76,211
Percentage	67.6%	32.4%
- County results Nunes: 60–70%
U.S. Representative before election
Devin Nunes
Republican
Elected U.S. Representative
Devin Nunes
Republican

The 22nd district is based in the Central Valley and includes Clovis, Tulare, and Visalia. Incumbent Republican Devin Nunes, who had represented the 22nd district since 2013 and previously represented the 21st district from 2003 to 2013, ran for re-election.

=== Primary election ===
==== Republican candidates ====
===== Advanced to general =====
- Devin Nunes, incumbent U.S. Representative

===== Eliminated in primary =====
- Teresita Andres, retired business owner

==== Democratic candidates ====
===== Advanced to general =====
- Louie Campos, accelerated instruction tutor

==== Endorsements ====
Louie Campos (D)

Organizations

- California Democratic Party

==== Results ====
Nonpartisan blanket primary results
Party	Candidate	Votes	%
Republican	Devin Nunes (incumbent)	86,479	63.8
Democratic	Louie J. Campos	40,247	29.7
Republican	Teresita "Tess" Andres	8,808	6.5
Total votes		135,534	100.0

=== General election ===
==== Predictions ====
Source	Ranking	As of
The Cook Political Report	Safe R	November 7, 2016
Daily Kos Elections	Safe R	November 7, 2016
Rothenberg	Safe R	November 3, 2016
Sabato's Crystal Ball	Safe R	November 7, 2016
RCP	Safe R	October 31, 2016

==== Endorsements ====
Devin Nunes (R)

Organizations

- Campaign for Working Families
Louie Campos (D)

Labor unions

- AFL-CIO
- International Brotherhood of Boilermakers

==== Results ====
California's 22nd congressional district election, 2016
Party	Candidate	Votes	%
Republican	Devin Nunes (incumbent)	158,755	67.6
Democratic	Louie J. Campos	76,211	32.4
Total votes		234,966	100.0
Republican hold			

== District 23 ==
2016 California's 23rd congressional district election
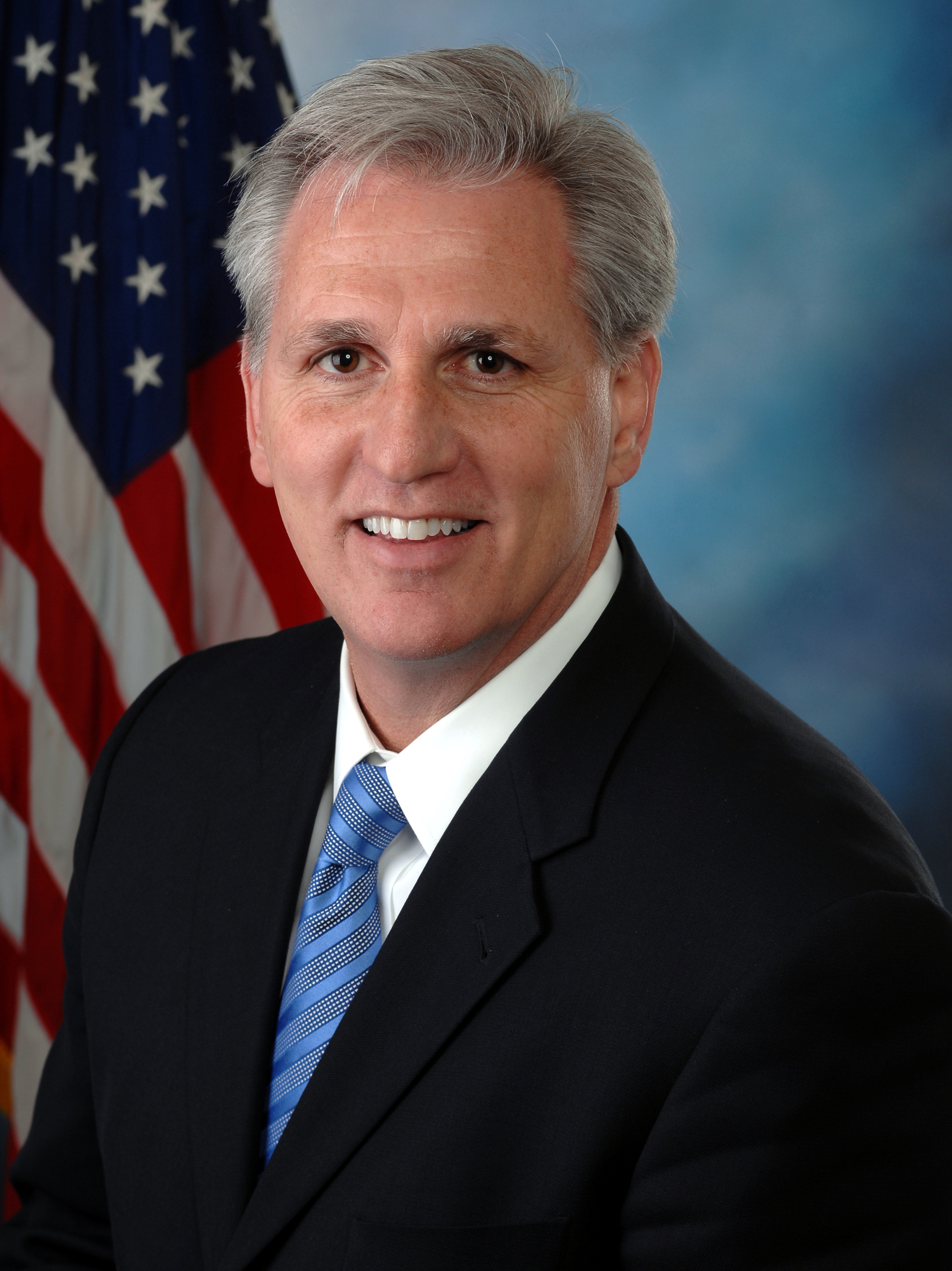

Nominee	Kevin McCarthy	Wendy Reed
Party	Republican	Democratic
Popular vote	167,116	74,468
Percentage	69.2%	30.8%
- County results Mccarthy: 50–60% 60–70% 70–80%
U.S. Representative before election
Kevin McCarthy
Republican
Elected U.S. Representative
Kevin McCarthy
Republican

The 23rd district is based in the southern Central Valley and includes parts of Bakersfield. Incumbent Republican House Majority Leader Kevin McCarthy, who had represented the 23rd district since 2013 and previously represented the 22nd district from 2007 to 2013, ran for re-election.

=== Primary election ===
==== Republican candidates ====
===== Advanced to general =====
- Kevin McCarthy, incumbent U.S. Representative

===== Eliminated in primary =====
- Ken Mettler, independent businessman
- Gerald Morris, gun room salesman

==== Democratic candidates ====
===== Advanced to general =====
- Wendy Reed, businesswoman and community advocate

==== Endorsements ====
Wendy Reed (D)

Labor unions

- AFL-CIO

Organizations

- California Democratic Party

==== Results ====
Nonpartisan blanket primary results
Party	Candidate	Votes	%
Republican	Kevin McCarthy (incumbent)	76,166	55.5
Democratic	Wendy Reed	37,696	27.4
Republican	Ken Mettler	17,738	12.9
Republican	Gerald Morris	5,734	4.2
Total votes		137,334	100.0

=== General election ===
==== Predictions ====
Source	Ranking	As of
The Cook Political Report	Safe R	November 7, 2016
Daily Kos Elections	Safe R	November 7, 2016
Rothenberg	Safe R	November 3, 2016
Sabato's Crystal Ball	Safe R	November 7, 2016
RCP	Safe R	October 31, 2016

==== Endorsements ====
Kevin McCarthy (R)

Organizations

- Campaign for Working Families
Wendy Reed (D)

Labor unions

- AFL-CIO
- International Brotherhood of Boilermakers

Organizations

- Progressive Democrats of America

==== Results ====
California's 23rd congressional district election, 2016
Party	Candidate	Votes	%
Republican	Kevin McCarthy (incumbent)	167,116	69.2
Democratic	Wendy Reed	74,468	30.8
Total votes		241,584	100.0
Republican hold			

== District 24 ==
2016 California's 24th congressional district election
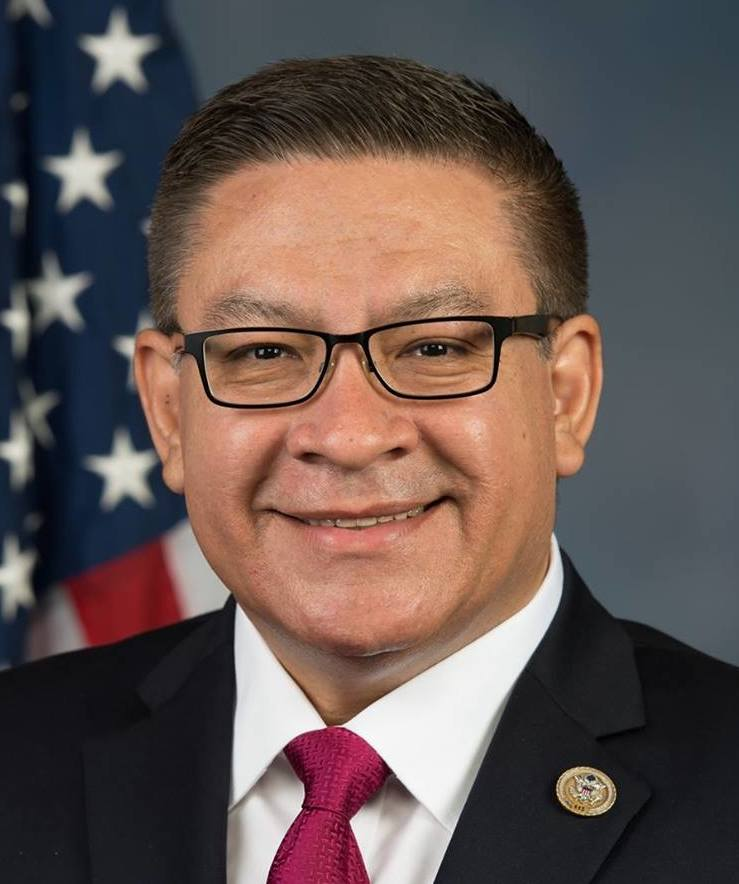

Nominee	Salud Carbajal	Justin Fareed
Party	Democratic	Republican
Popular vote	166,034	144,780
Percentage	53.4%	46.6%
- County results Fareed: 50–60% Carbajal: 50–60%
U.S. Representative before election
Lois Capps
Democratic
Elected U.S. Representative
Salud Carbajal
Democratic

The 24th district is based in the Central Coast and includes San Luis Obispo and Santa Barbara. Incumbent Democrat Lois Capps, who had represented the 24th district since 2013 and previously represented the 23rd district from 2003 to 2013 and the 22nd district from 1998 to 2003, retired.

=== Primary election ===
==== Democratic candidates ====
===== Advanced to general =====
- Salud Carbajal, Santa Barbara County Supervisor

===== Eliminated in primary =====
- Bernjamin Lucas, design consultant
- William Ostrander, farmer and non-profit director
- Helene Schneider, Mayor of Santa Barbara

===== Declined =====
- Laura Capps, political operative and daughter of Lois Capps
- Lois Capps, incumbent U.S. Representative
- Das Williams, state assembly member

==== Republican candidates ====
===== Advanced to general =====
- Justin Fareed, cattle rancher, businessman and candidate for this seat in 2014

===== Eliminated in primary =====
- Katcho Achadjian, state assembly member
- Matt Kokkonen, financial planner and businessman

===== Withdrawn =====
- Tyler Gross, paralegal

===== Declined =====
- Christopher Mitchum, former actor, businessman, candidate for this seat in 2012 and general election candidate in 2014 (endorsed Achadjian)

==== Independent candidates ====
===== Eliminated in primary =====
- Steve Isakson, electronics engineer and businessman
- John Uebersax, social scientist and biostatistician

==== Endorsements ====
Salud Carbajal (D)

U.S. Representatives

- Lois Capps, U.S. Representative (CA-24)
- Nancy Pelosi, U.S. Representative (CA-12) and former Speaker of the House

State officials

- Kamala Harris, State Attorney General

Labor unions

- AFL-CIO
- California Federation of Teachers
- Service Employees International Union

Organizations

- California Democratic Party
- VoteVets
Helene Schneider (D)

State officials

- Gavin Newsom, Lieutenant Governor of California

State legislators

- Hannah-Beth Jackson, state senator

==== Results ====
Nonpartisan blanket primary results
Party	Candidate	Votes	%
Democratic	Salud Carbajal	66,402	31.9
Republican	Justin Fareed	42,521	20.5
Republican	Katcho Achadjian	37,716	18.1
Democratic	Helene Schneider	31,046	14.9
Democratic	William "Bill" Ostrander	12,657	6.1
Republican	Matt T. Kokkonen	11,636	5.6
No party preference	John Uebersax	2,188	1.1
No party preference	Steve Isakson	2,172	1.0
Democratic	Benjamin Lucas	1,568	0.8
Total votes		207,906	100.0

=== General election ===
==== Endorsements ====
Salud Carbajal (D)

Labor unions

- AFL-CIO
- Communications Workers of America
- International Brotherhood of Boilermakers
- Service Employees International Union

Organizations

- Democratic Congressional Campaign Committee "Red to Blue" Program
- End Citizens United
- Equality California
- VoteVets
Justin Fareed (R)

Organizations

- National Republican Congressional Committee "Young Guns" Program

==== Polling ====
Poll source	Date(s) administered	Sample size	Margin of error	Salud Carbajal (D)	Justin Fareed (R)	Undecided
The Tarrance Group (R-Fareed)	September 17–19, 2016	400	± 4.9%	43%	46%	11%
The Tarrance Group (R-Fareed)	July 10–12, 2016	350	± 4.9%	44%	46%	10%

==== Predictions ====
Source	Ranking	As of
The Cook Political Report	Lean D	November 7, 2016
Daily Kos Elections	Lean D	November 7, 2016
Rothenberg	Likely D	November 3, 2016
Sabato's Crystal Ball	Lean D	November 7, 2016
RCP	Lean D	October 31, 2016

==== Results ====
California's 24th congressional district election, 2016
Party	Candidate	Votes	%
Democratic	Salud Carbajal	166,034	53.4
Republican	Justin Fareed	144,780	46.6
Total votes		310,814	100.0
Democratic hold			

== District 25 ==
2016 California's 25th congressional district election
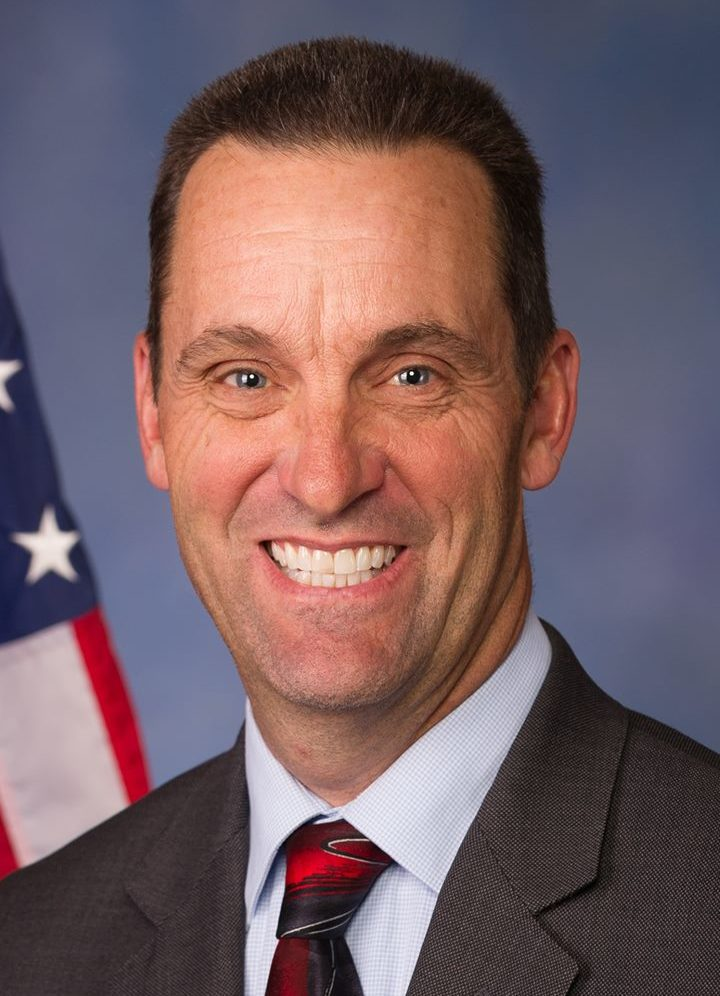

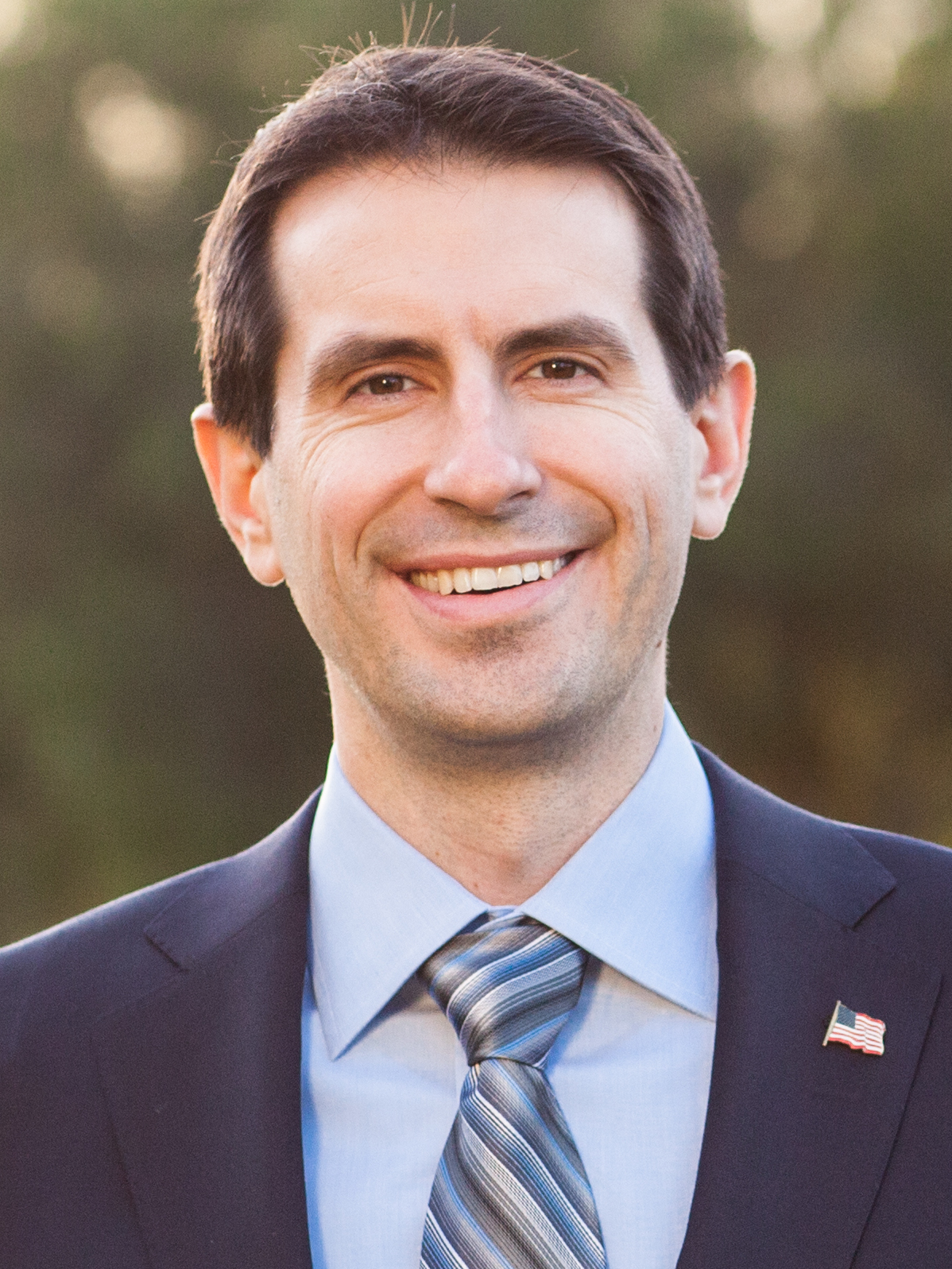
Nominee	Steve Knight	Bryan Caforio
Party	Republican	Democratic
Popular vote	138,755	122,406
Percentage	53.1%	46.9%
- County results Knight: 50–60%
U.S. Representative before election
Steve Knight
Republican
Elected U.S. Representative
Steve Knight
Republican

The 25th district is based in northern Los Angeles County and includes Palmdale and Santa Clarita. Incumbent Republican Steve Knight, who had represented the 25th district since 2015, ran for re-election.

=== Primary election ===
==== Republican candidates ====
===== Advanced to general =====
- Steve Knight, incumbent U.S. Representative

===== Eliminated in primary =====
- Jeffrey Moffatt, tax attorney

==== Democratic candidates ====
===== Advanced to general =====
- Bryan Caforio, attorney

===== Eliminated in primary =====
- Lou Vince, Agua Dulce Town Council member

===== Withdrawn =====
- Maria Gutzeit, Santa Clarita Water Board member (withdrew in January 2016)
- Evan Thomas, test pilot, retired Air Force officer and candidate for this seat in 2014

==== Endorsements ====
Bryan Caforio (D)

Labor unions

- AFL-CIO
- Service Employees International Union
Lou Vince (D)

Organizations

- California Democratic Party

==== Results ====
Nonpartisan blanket primary results
Party	Candidate	Votes	%
Republican	Steve Knight (incumbent)	63,769	48.3
Democratic	Bryan Caforio	38,382	29.0
Democratic	Lou Vince	20,327	15.4
Republican	Jeffrey Moffatt	9,620	7.3
No party preference	Jeff Bomberger (write-in)	44	0.0
Total votes		132,142	100.0

=== General election ===
==== Endorsements ====
Steve Knight (R)

Organizations

- BIPAC
- Campaign for Working Families
- National Republican Congressional Committee "Patriot" Program
Bryan Caforio (D)

Labor unions

- AFL-CIO
- Communications Workers of America
- International Brotherhood of Boilermakers
- Service Employees International Union

Organizations

- Democratic Congressional Campaign Committee "Red to Blue" Program
- End Citizens United
- Equality California

==== Polling ====
Poll source	Date(s) administered	Sample size	Margin of error	Steve Knight (R)	Bryan Caforio (D)	Undecided
Tulchin Research (D)	October 14–18, 2016	400	± 4.9%	46%	44%	10%
DCCC	July 30, 2016	400	± 4.9%	46%	40%	14%

==== Predictions ====
Source	Ranking	As of
The Cook Political Report	Tossup	November 7, 2016
Daily Kos Elections	Tossup	November 7, 2016
Rothenberg	Likely R	November 3, 2016
Sabato's Crystal Ball	Lean D (flip)	November 7, 2016
RCP	Tossup	October 31, 2016

==== Results ====
California's 25th congressional district election, 2016
Party	Candidate	Votes	%
Republican	Steve Knight (incumbent)	138,755	53.1
Democratic	Bryan Caforio	122,406	46.9
Total votes		261,161	100.0
Republican hold			

== District 26 ==
2016 California's 26th congressional district election
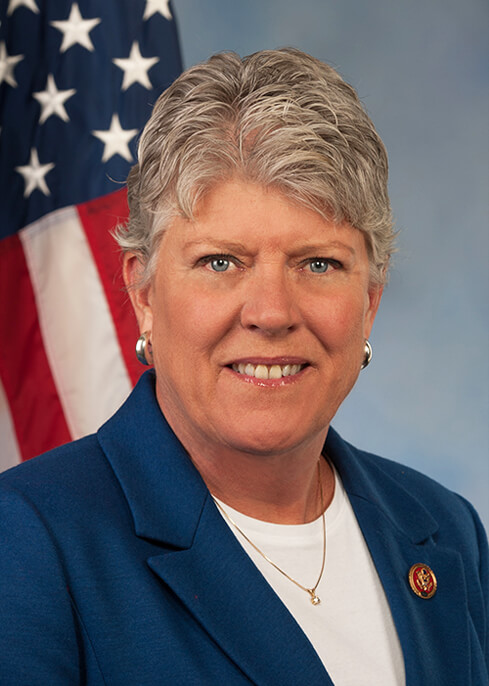

Nominee	Julia Brownley	Rafael Dagnesses
Party	Democratic	Republican
Popular vote	169,248	111,059
Percentage	60.4%	39.6%
- County results Brownley: 50–60% 60–70%
U.S. Representative before election
Julia Brownley
Democratic
Elected U.S. Representative
Julia Brownley
Democratic

The 26th district is based in the southern Central Coast and includes Oxnard and Thousand Oaks. Incumbent Democrat Julia Brownley, who had represented the 26th district since 2013, ran for re-election.

=== Primary election ===
==== Democratic candidates ====
===== Advanced to general =====
- Julia Brownley, incumbent U.S. Representative

==== Republican candidates ====
===== Advanced to general =====
- Rafael Dagnesses, business owner, entrepreneur and candidate for this seat in 2014

==== Endorsements ====
Julia Brownley (D)

Labor unions

- AFL-CIO
- Service Employees International Union

Organizations

- California Democratic Party

==== Results ====
Nonpartisan blanket primary results
Party	Candidate	Votes	%
Democratic	Julia Brownley (incumbent)	108,937	64.0
Republican	Rafael A. Dagnesses	61,219	36.0
Total votes		170,156	100.0

=== General election ===
==== Predictions ====
Source	Ranking	As of
The Cook Political Report	Safe D	November 7, 2016
Daily Kos Elections	Safe D	November 7, 2016
Rothenberg	Safe D	November 3, 2016
Sabato's Crystal Ball	Safe D	November 7, 2016
RCP	Safe D	October 31, 2016

==== Endorsements ====
Julia Brownley (D)

Labor unions

- AFL-CIO
- Communications Workers of America
- International Brotherhood of Boilermakers
- Service Employees International Union

Organizations

- Democratic Congressional Campaign Committee "Frontline" Program
- EMILY's List
- End Citizens United
- Equality California

==== Results ====
California's 26th congressional district election, 2016
Party	Candidate	Votes	%
Democratic	Julia Brownley (incumbent)	169,248	60.4
Republican	Rafael A. Dagnesses	111,059	39.6
Total votes		280,307	100.0
Democratic hold			

== District 27 ==
2016 California's 27th congressional district election
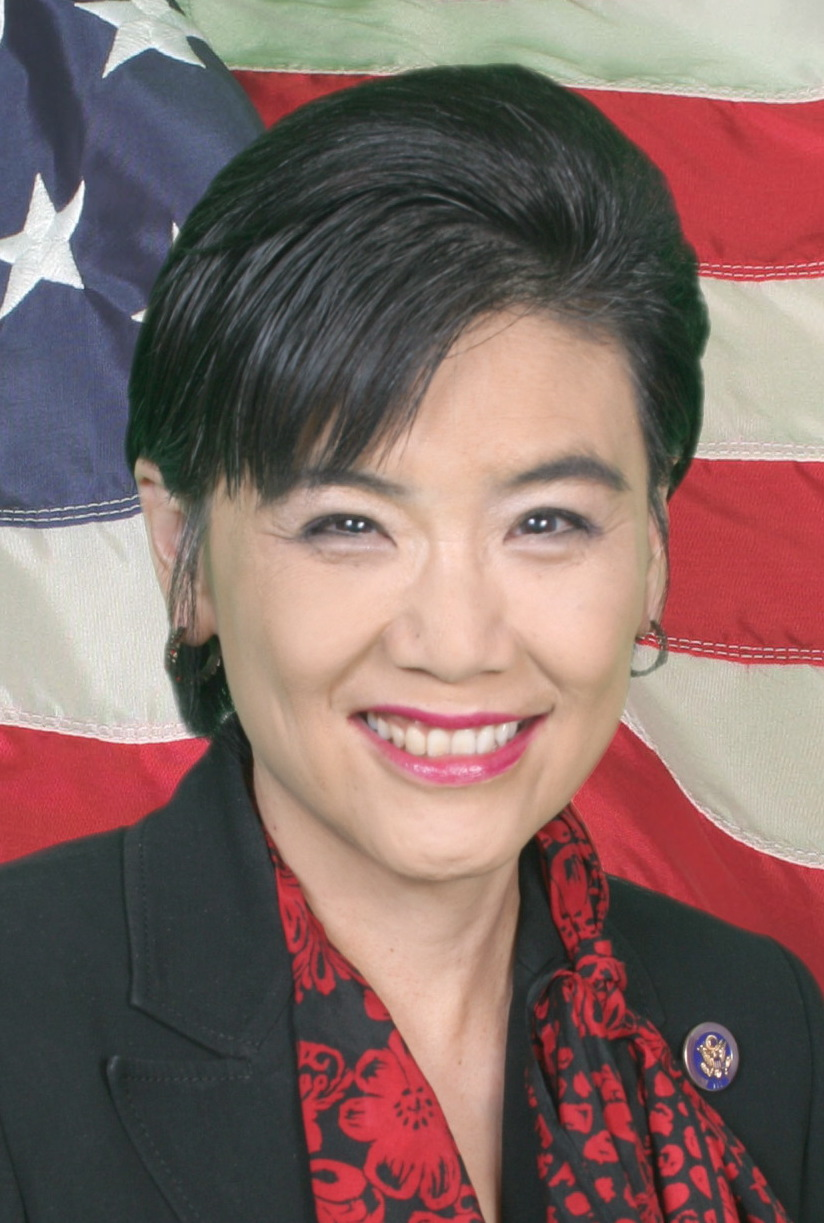

Nominee	Judy Chu	Jack Orswell
Party	Democratic	Republican
Popular vote	168,977	81,655
Percentage	67.4%	32.6%
- County results Chu: 60–70% Orswell: 50–60%
U.S. Representative before election
Judy Chu
Democratic
Elected U.S. Representative
Judy Chu
Democratic

The 27th district is based in the San Gabriel Foothills and includes Alhambra, Glendora and Pasadena. Incumbent Democrat Judy Chu, who had represented the 27th district since 2013 and previously represented the 32nd district from 2009 to 2013, ran for re-election.

=== Primary election ===
==== Democratic candidates ====
===== Advanced to general =====
- Judy Chu, incumbent U.S. Representative

==== Republican candidates ====
===== Advanced to general =====
- Jack Orswell, businessman and environmental consultant

==== Independent candidates ====
===== Eliminated in primary =====
- Tim Sweeney, business consultant and attorney

==== Endorsements ====
Judy Chu (D)

Labor unions

- AFL-CIO

Organizations

- California Democratic Party

==== Results ====
Nonpartisan blanket primary results
Party	Candidate	Votes	%
Democratic	Judy Chu (incumbent)	93,204	66.2
Republican	Jack Orswell	39,574	28.1
No party preference	Tim Sweeney	8,063	5.7
Total votes		133,581	100.0

=== General election ===
==== Predictions ====
Source	Ranking	As of
The Cook Political Report	Safe D	November 7, 2016
Daily Kos Elections	Safe D	November 7, 2016
Rothenberg	Safe D	November 3, 2016
Sabato's Crystal Ball	Safe D	November 7, 2016
RCP	Safe D	October 31, 2016

==== Endorsements ====
Judy Chu (D)

Labor unions

- AFL-CIO
- Communications Workers of America
- International Brotherhood of Boilermakers

Organizations

- Equality California

==== Results ====
California's 27th congressional district election, 2016
Party	Candidate	Votes	%
Democratic	Judy Chu (incumbent)	168,977	67.4
Republican	Jack Orswell	81,655	32.6
Total votes		250,632	100.0
Democratic hold			

== District 28 ==
2016 California's 28th congressional district election
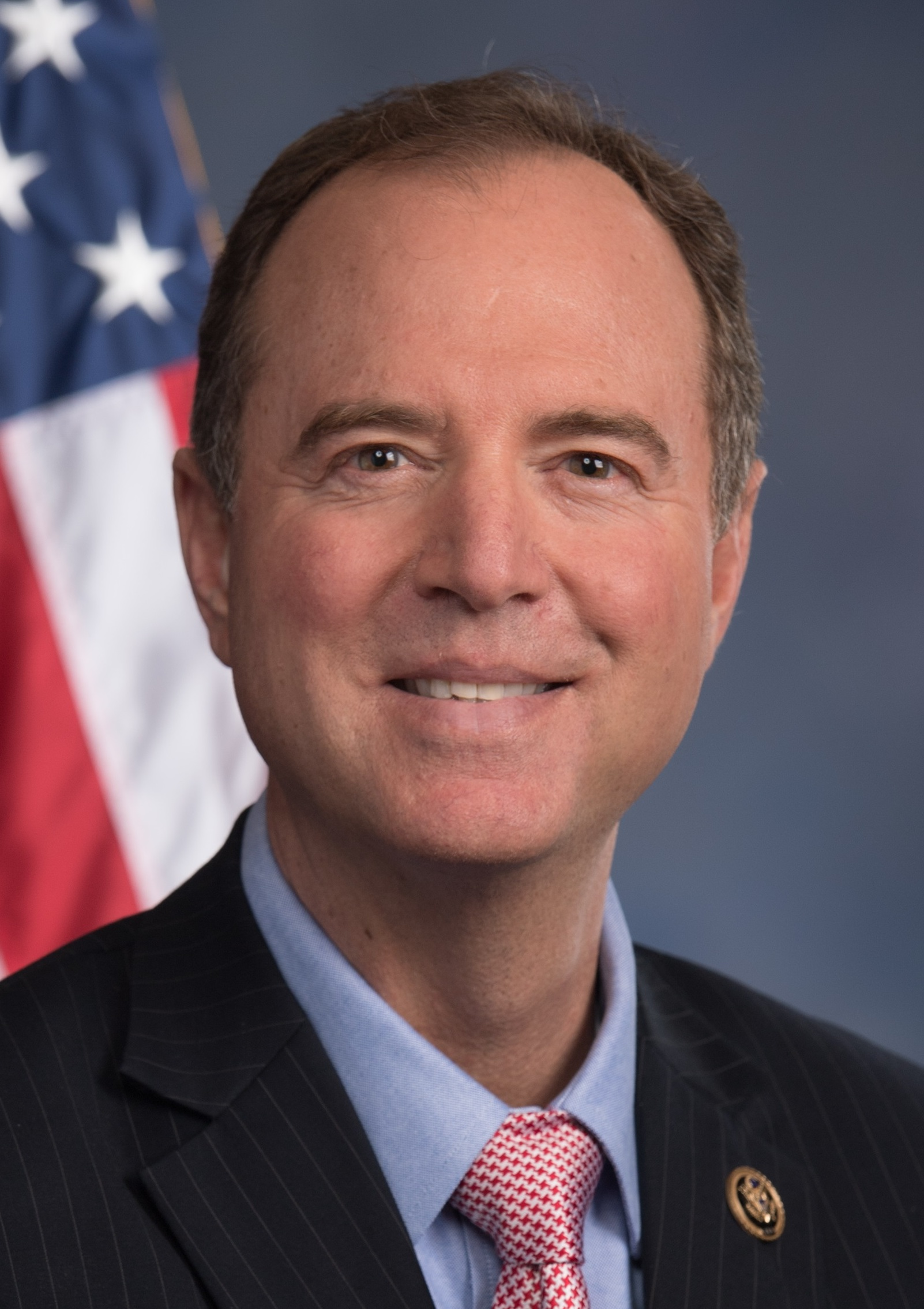

Nominee	Adam Schiff	Lenore Solis
Party	Democratic	Republican
Popular vote	210,883	59,526
Percentage	78.0%	22.0%
- County results Schiff: 70–80%
U.S. Representative before election
Adam Schiff
Democratic
Elected U.S. Representative
Adam Schiff
Democratic

The 28th district is based in the northern Los Angeles suburbs and includes Burbank and Glendale as well as parts of central Los Angeles. Incumbent Democrat Adam Schiff, who had represented the 28th district since 2013 and previously represented the 29th district from 2003 to 2013 and the 27th district from 2001 to 2003, ran for re-election.

=== Primary election ===
==== Democratic candidates ====
===== Advanced to general =====
- Adam Schiff, incumbent U.S. Representative

===== Eliminated in primary =====
- Sal Genovese, community services director and candidate for this seat in 2012 & 2014

==== Republican candidates ====
===== Advanced to general =====
- Lenore Solis, business owner

===== Withdrawn =====
- Casey Gray

==== Endorsements ====
Adam Schiff (D)

Labor unions

- AFL-CIO

Organizations

- California Democratic Party

==== Results ====
Nonpartisan blanket primary results
Party	Candidate	Votes	%
Democratic	Adam Schiff (incumbent)	111,766	70.2
Republican	Lenore Solis	29,336	18.4
Democratic	Sal Genovese	18,026	11.3
Total votes		159,128	100.0

=== General election ===
==== Predictions ====
Source	Ranking	As of
The Cook Political Report	Safe D	November 7, 2016
Daily Kos Elections	Safe D	November 7, 2016
Rothenberg	Safe D	November 3, 2016
Sabato's Crystal Ball	Safe D	November 7, 2016
RCP	Safe D	October 31, 2016

==== Endorsements ====
Adam Schiff (D)

Labor unions

- AFL-CIO
- Communications Workers of America
- International Brotherhood of Boilermakers

Organizations

- Equality California

==== Results ====
California's 28th congressional district election, 2016
Party	Candidate	Votes	%
Democratic	Adam Schiff (incumbent)	210,883	78.0
Republican	Lenore Solis	59,526	22.0
Total votes		270,409	100.0
Democratic hold			

== District 29 ==
2016 California's 29th congressional district election
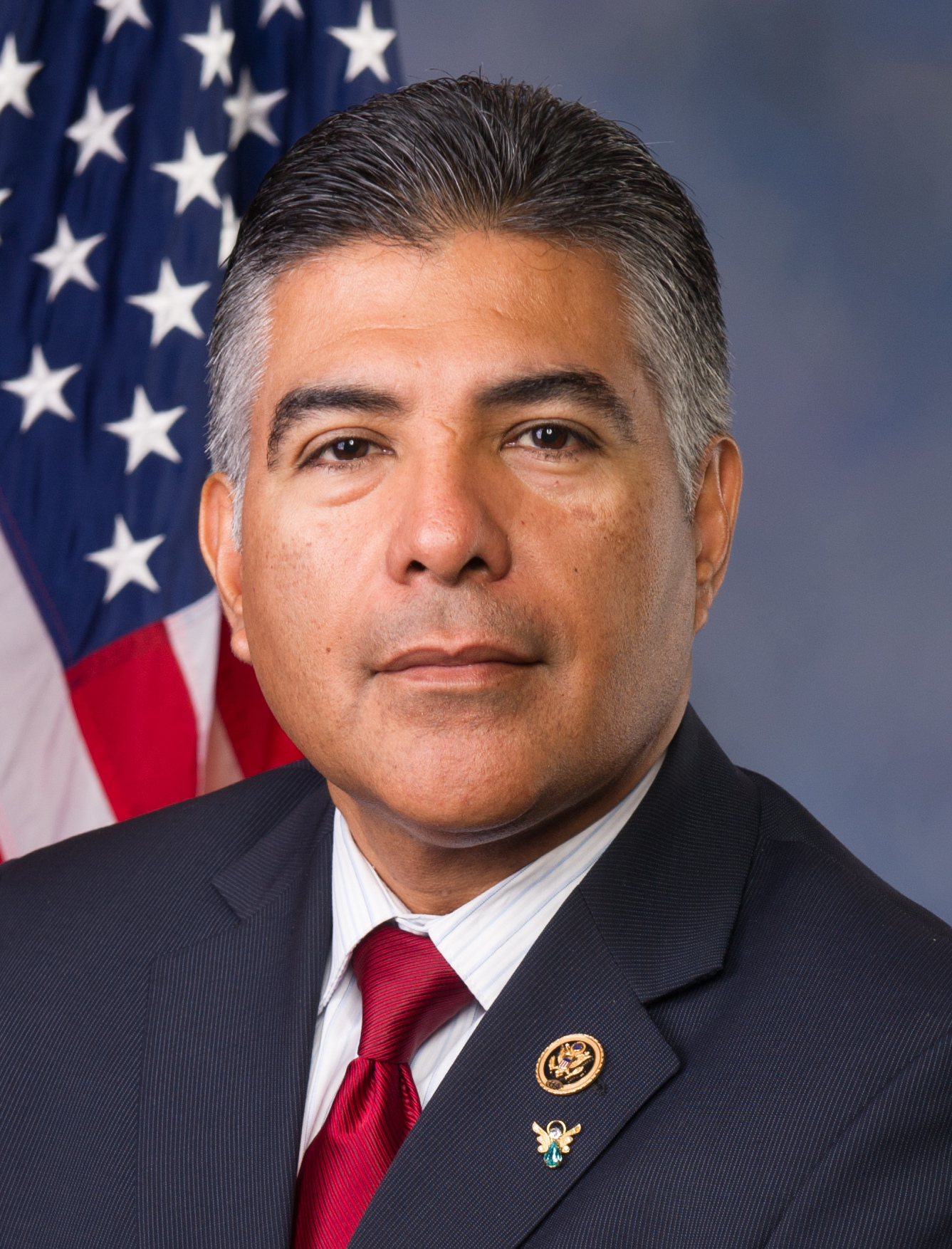

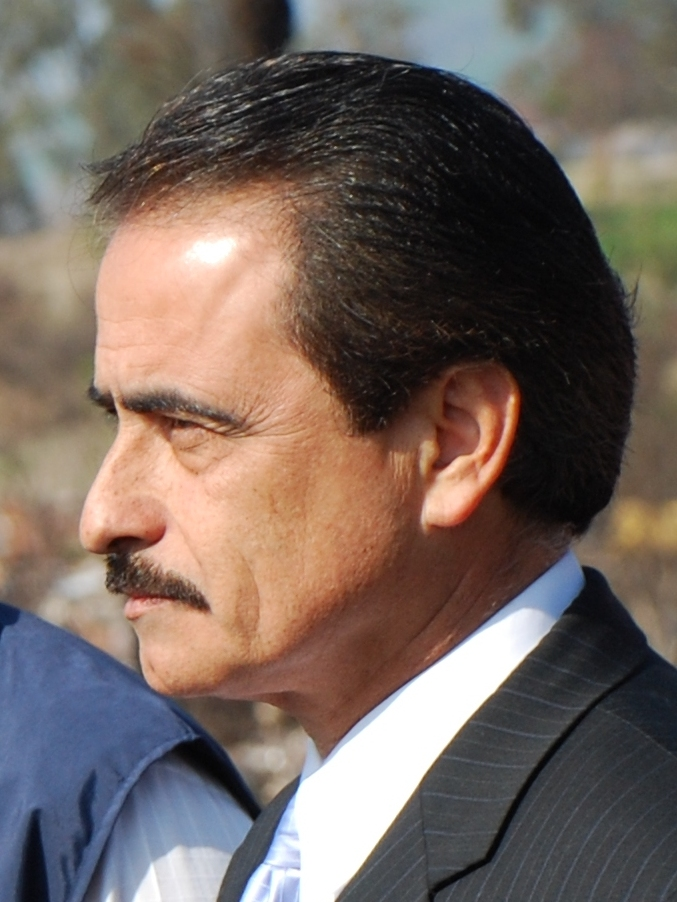
Nominee	Tony Cardenas	Richard Alarcon
Party	Democratic	Democratic
Popular vote	128,407	43,417
Percentage	74.7%	25.3%
U.S. Representative before election
Tony Cardenas
Democratic
Elected U.S. Representative
Tony Cardenas
Democratic

The 29th district is based in the northeastern San Fernando Valley. Incumbent Democrat Tony Cardenas, who had represented the 29th district since 2013, ran for re-election.

=== Primary election ===
==== Democratic candidates ====
===== Advanced to general =====
- Richard Alarcon, former Los Angeles City Council member
- Tony Cardenas, incumbent U.S. Representative

===== Eliminated in primary =====
- Benny Bernal, community advocate
- David Guzman, TV director's assistant
- Joseph Shammas, retired military officer

==== Endorsements ====
Tony Cardenas (D)

Labor unions

- AFL-CIO

==== Results ====
Nonpartisan blanket primary results
Party	Candidate	Votes	%
Democratic	Tony Cardenas (incumbent)	58,616	61.4
Democratic	Richard Alarcon	12,397	13.0
Democratic	Joseph "Joe" Shammas	10,847	11.4
Democratic	Benny "Benito" Bernal	10,006	10.5
Democratic	David Z. Guzman	3,654	3.8
Total votes		95,520	100.0

=== General election ===
==== Predictions ====
Source	Ranking	As of
The Cook Political Report	Safe D	November 7, 2016
Daily Kos Elections	Safe D	November 7, 2016
Rothenberg	Safe D	November 3, 2016
Sabato's Crystal Ball	Safe D	November 7, 2016
RCP	Safe D	October 31, 2016

==== Endorsements ====
Tony Cardenas (D)

Labor unions

- AFL-CIO
- Communications Workers of America
- International Brotherhood of Boilermakers

Organizations

- California Democratic Party
- Equality California

==== Results ====
California's 29th congressional district election, 2016
Party	Candidate	Votes	%
Democratic	Tony Cardenas (incumbent)	128,407	74.7
Democratic	Richard Alarcon	43,417	25.3
Total votes		171,824	100.0
Democratic hold			

== District 30 ==
2016 California's 30th congressional district election
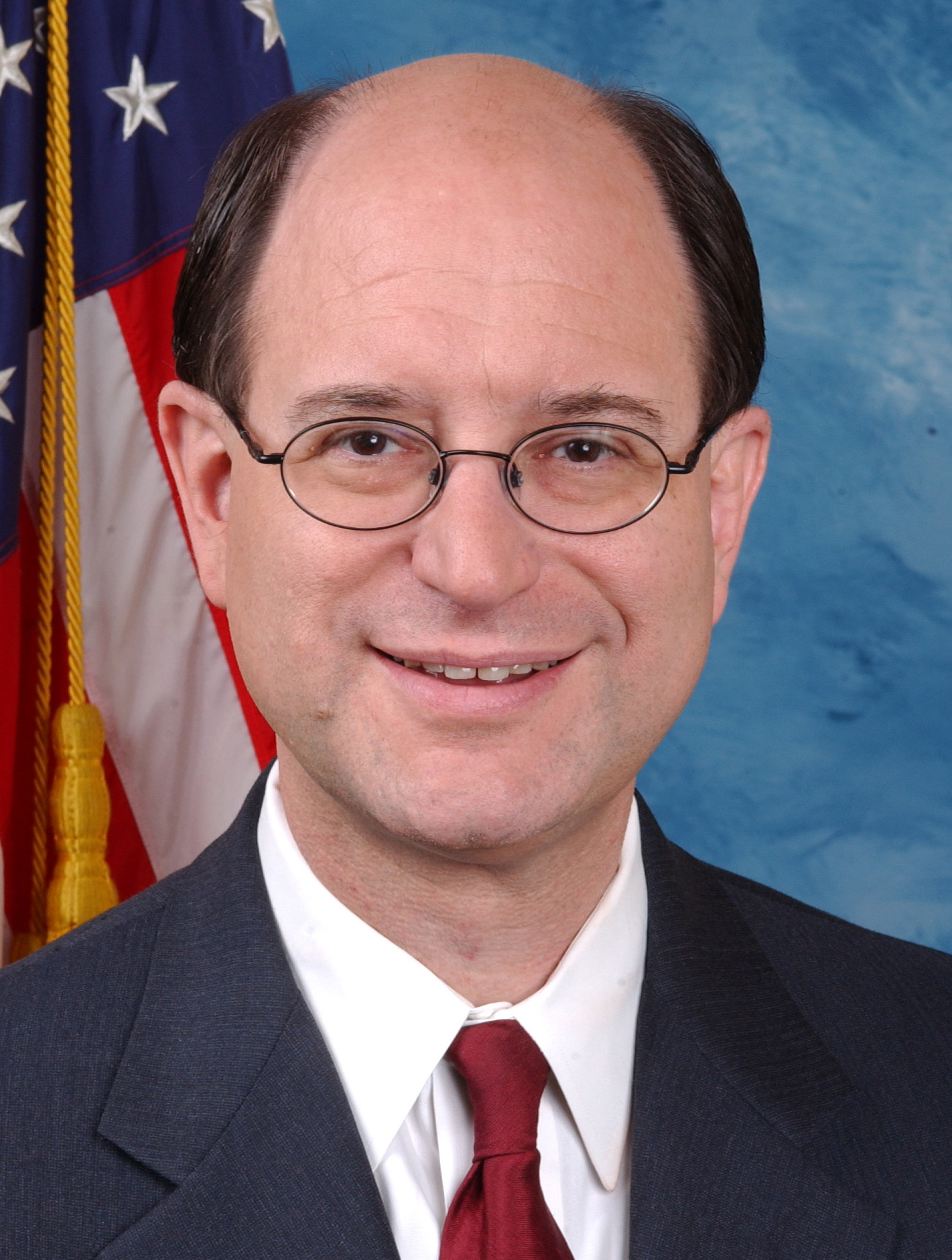

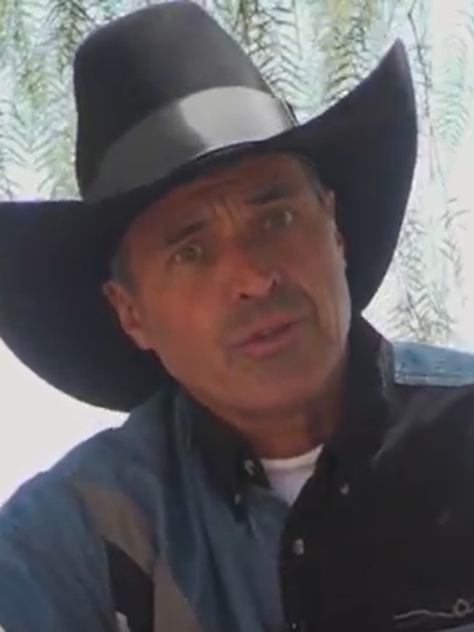
Nominee	Brad Sherman	Mark Reed
Party	Democratic	Republican
Popular vote	205,279	77,325
Percentage	72.6%	27.4%
- County results Sherman: 50–60% 70–80%
U.S. Representative before election
Brad Sherman
Democratic
Elected U.S. Representative
Brad Sherman
Democratic

The 30th district is based in the western San Fernando Valley and includes Sherman Oaks. Incumbent Democrat Brad Sherman, who had represented the 30th district since 2013 and previously represented the 27th district from 2003 to 2013 and the 24th district from 1997 to 2003, ran for re-election.

=== Primary election ===
==== Democratic candidates ====
===== Advanced to general =====
- Brad Sherman, incumbent U.S. Representative

===== Eliminated in primary =====
- Luke Davis, business owner
- Patrea Patrick, documentary producer and author
- Raji Rab, aviator and educator

==== Republican candidates ====
===== Advanced to general =====
- Mark Reed, television journalist, businessman and general election candidate for this seat in 2014

===== Eliminated in primary =====
- Navraj Singh, business owner
- Chris Townsend, marketing sales advisor

==== Endorsements ====
Brad Sherman (D)

Labor unions

- AFL-CIO

Organizations

- California Democratic Party

==== Results ====
Nonpartisan blanket primary results
Party	Candidate	Votes	%
Democratic	Brad Sherman (incumbent)	92,448	60.1
Republican	Mark Reed	21,458	14.0
Democratic	Patrea Patrick	14,628	9.5
Democratic	A. (Raji) Rab	8,847	5.8
Republican	Navraj Singh	6,517	4.2
Democratic	Luke Davis	5,150	3.3
Republican	Christopher David Townsend	4,741	3.1
Total votes		153,789	100.0

=== General election ===
==== Predictions ====
Source	Ranking	As of
The Cook Political Report	Safe D	November 7, 2016
Daily Kos Elections	Safe D	November 7, 2016
Rothenberg	Safe D	November 3, 2016
Sabato's Crystal Ball	Safe D	November 7, 2016
RCP	Safe D	October 31, 2016

==== Endorsements ====
Brad Sherman (D)

Labor unions

- AFL-CIO
- Communications Workers of America
- International Brotherhood of Boilermakers

Organizations

- Equality California

==== Results ====
California's 30th congressional district election, 2016
Party	Candidate	Votes	%
Democratic	Brad Sherman (incumbent)	205,279	72.6
Republican	Mark Reed	77,325	27.4
Total votes		282,604	100.0
Democratic hold			

== District 31 ==
2016 California's 31st congressional district election
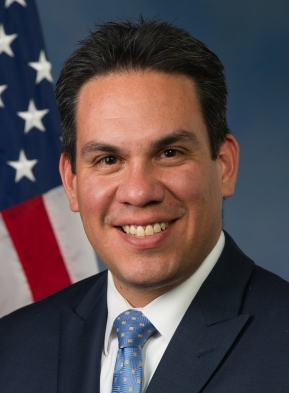

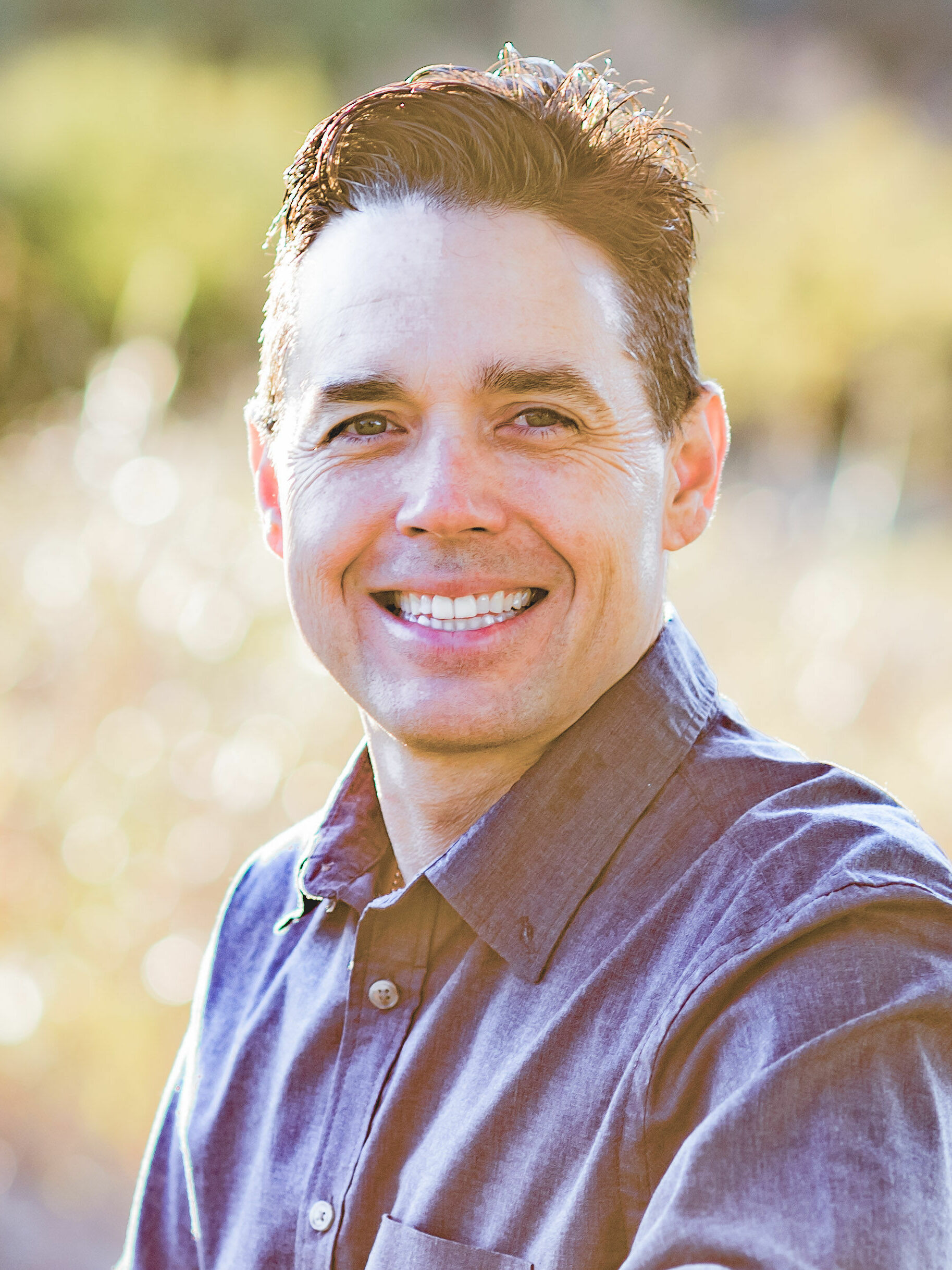
Nominee	Pete Aguilar	Paul Chabot
Party	Democratic	Republican
Popular vote	121,070	94,866
Percentage	56.1%	43.9%
- County results Aguilar: 50–60%
U.S. Representative before election
Pete Aguilar
Democratic
Elected U.S. Representative
Pete Aguilar
Democratic

The 31st district is based in the Inland Empire and includes San Bernardino and Rancho Cucamonga. Incumbent Democrat Pete Aguilar, who had represented the 31st district since 2015, ran for re-election.

=== Primary election ===
==== Democratic candidates ====
===== Advanced to general =====
- Pete Aguilar, incumbent U.S. Representative

===== Eliminated in primary =====
- Kaisar Ahmed, retired educator

==== Republican candidates ====
===== Eliminated in primary =====
- Joe Baca, former Democratic U.S. Representative
- Sean Flynn, economist, businessman and educator

==== Endorsements ====
Pete Aguilar (D)

Labor unions

- AFL-CIO

Organizations

- California Democratic Party

==== Results ====
Nonpartisan blanket primary results
Party	Candidate	Votes	%
Democratic	Pete Aguilar (incumbent)	48,518	43.1
Republican	Paul Chabot	25,534	22.7
Republican	Joe Baca	14,020	12.4
Democratic	Kaisar Ahmed	12,418	11.0
Republican	Sean Flynn	12,130	10.8
Total votes		112,620	100.0

=== General election ===
==== Predictions ====
Source	Ranking	As of
The Cook Political Report	Safe D	November 7, 2016
Daily Kos Elections	Safe D	November 7, 2016
Rothenberg	Safe D	November 3, 2016
Sabato's Crystal Ball	Safe D	November 7, 2016
RCP	Safe D	October 31, 2016

==== Endorsements ====
Pete Aguilar (D)

Labor unions

- AFL-CIO
- Communications Workers of America
- International Brotherhood of Boilermakers

Organizations

- Democratic Congressional Campaign Committee "Frontline" Program
- End Citizens United

==== Results ====
California's 31st congressional district election, 2016
Party	Candidate	Votes	%
Democratic	Pete Aguilar (incumbent)	121,070	56.1
Republican	Paul Chabot	94,866	43.9
Total votes		215,936	100.0
Democratic hold			

== District 32 ==
2016 California's 32nd congressional district election
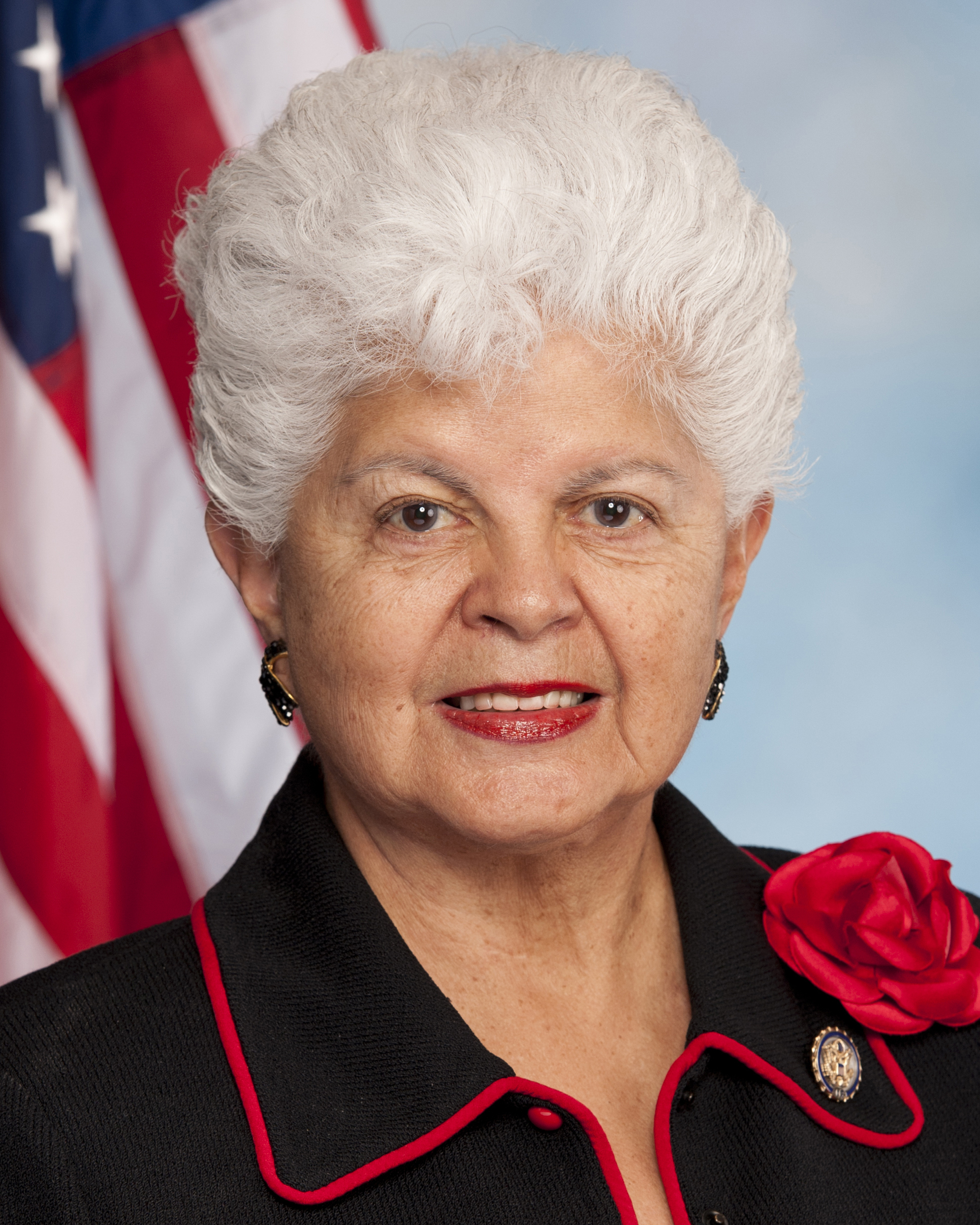

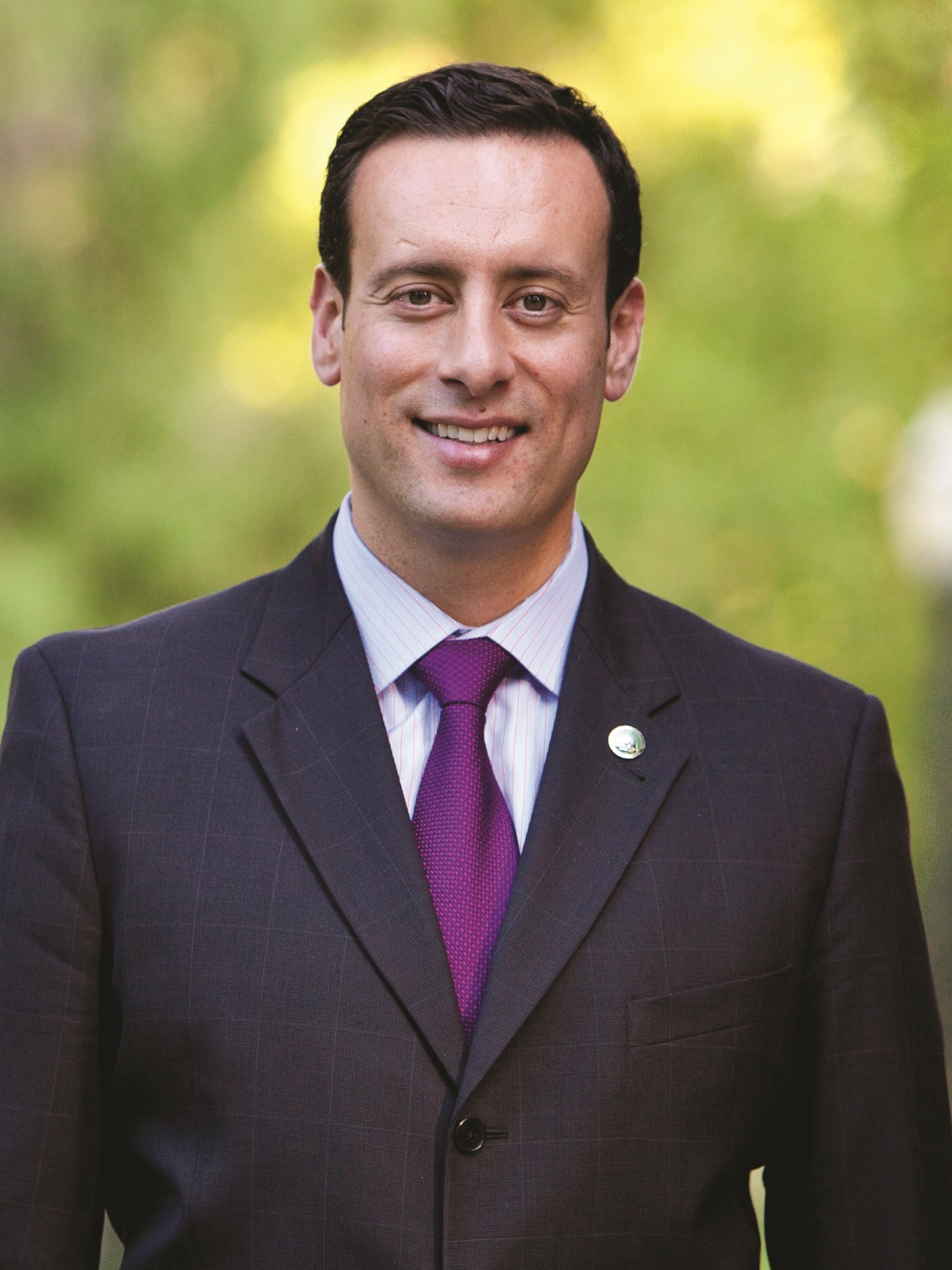
Nominee	Grace Napolitano	Roger Hernández
Party	Democratic	Democratic
Popular vote	114,926	71,720
Percentage	61.6%	38.4%
U.S. Representative before election
Grace Napolitano
Democratic
Elected U.S. Representative
Grace Napolitano
Democratic

The 32nd district is based in the San Gabriel Valley and includes El Monte and West Covina. Incumbent Democrat Grace Napolitano, who had represented the 32nd district since 2013 and previously represented the 38th district from 2003 to 2013 and the 34th district from 1999 to 2003, ran for re-election.

=== Primary election ===
==== Democratic candidates ====
===== Advanced to general =====
- Roger Hernández, state assembly member
- Grace Napolitano, incumbent U.S. Representative

==== Republican candidates ====
===== Eliminated in primary =====
- Gordon Fisher, businessman

==== Endorsements ====
Roger Hernández (D)

Labor unions

- Service Employees International Union
Grace Napolitano (D)

Organizations

- California Democratic Party

==== Results ====
Nonpartisan blanket primary results
Party	Candidate	Votes	%
Democratic	Grace Napolitano (incumbent)	54,987	51.4
Democratic	Roger Hernández	26,386	24.7
Republican	Gordon E. Fisher	25,594	23.9
Total votes		106,967	100.0

=== General election ===
==== Campaign ====
In August, Hernández withdrew from the race, citing the fallout from his controversial divorce as the primary reason. He did, however, remain on the ballot.

==== Predictions ====
Source	Ranking	As of
The Cook Political Report	Safe D	November 7, 2016
Daily Kos Elections	Safe D	November 7, 2016
Rothenberg	Safe D	November 3, 2016
Sabato's Crystal Ball	Safe D	November 7, 2016
RCP	Safe D	October 31, 2016

==== Endorsements ====
Grace Napolitano (D)

Labor unions

- Communications Workers of America

Organizations

- EMILY's List
- Equality California

==== Results ====
California's 32nd congressional district election, 2016
Party	Candidate	Votes	%
Democratic	Grace Napolitano (incumbent)	114,926	61.6
Democratic	Roger Hernández	71,720	38.4
Total votes		186,646	100.0
Democratic hold			

== District 33 ==
2016 California's 33rd congressional district election
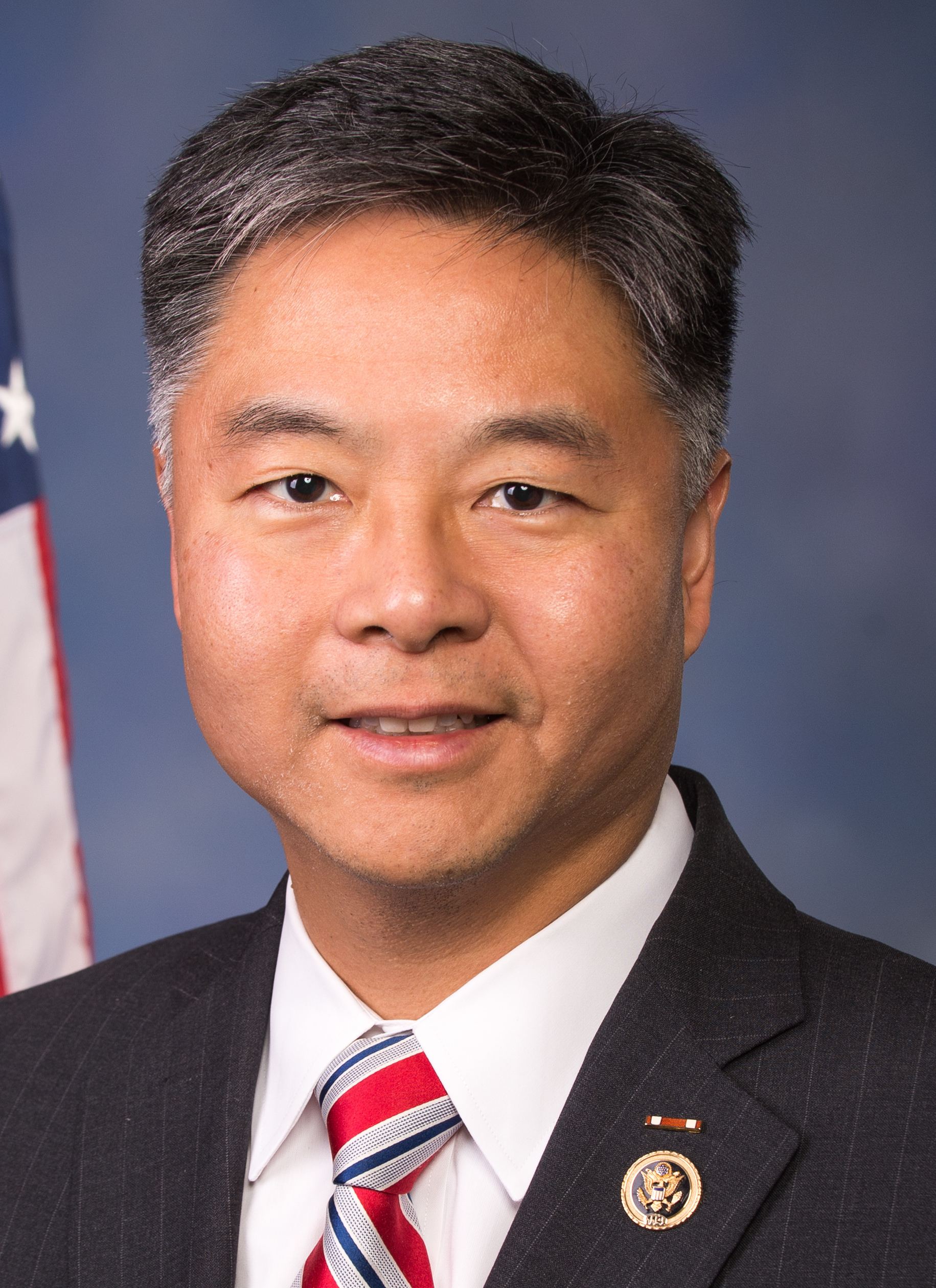

Nominee	Ted Lieu	Kenneth Wright
Party	Democratic	Republican
Popular vote	219,397	110,822
Percentage	66.4%	33.6%
- County results Lieu: 60–70%
U.S. Representative before election
Ted Lieu
Democratic
Elected U.S. Representative
Ted Lieu
Democratic

The 33rd district is based in coastal Los Angeles County and includes Beverly Hills and Santa Monica. Incumbent Democrat Ted Lieu, who had represented the 33rd district since 2015, ran for re-election.

=== Primary election ===
==== Democratic candidates ====
===== Advanced to general =====
- Ted Lieu, incumbent U.S. Representative

==== Republican candidates ====
===== Advanced to general =====
- Kenneth Wright, physician and surgeon

==== Endorsements ====
Ted Lieu (D)

Labor unions

- AFL-CIO

Organizations

- California Democratic Party

==== Results ====
Nonpartisan blanket primary results
Party	Candidate	Votes	%
Democratic	Ted Lieu (incumbent)	127,733	69.2
Republican	Kenneth W. Wright	56,976	30.8
Total votes		184,709	100.0

=== General election ===
==== Predictions ====
Source	Ranking	As of
The Cook Political Report	Safe D	November 7, 2016
Daily Kos Elections	Safe D	November 7, 2016
Rothenberg	Safe D	November 3, 2016
Sabato's Crystal Ball	Safe D	November 7, 2016
RCP	Safe D	October 31, 2016

==== Endorsements ====
Ted Lieu (D)

Labor unions

- AFL-CIO
- Communications Workers of America
- International Brotherhood of Boilermakers

Organizations

- Equality California
- Progressive Democrats of America
- VoteVets

==== Results ====
California's 33rd congressional district election, 2016
Party	Candidate	Votes	%
Democratic	Ted Lieu (incumbent)	219,397	66.4
Republican	Kenneth W. Wright	110,822	33.6
Total votes		330,219	100.0
Democratic hold			

== District 34 ==
2016 California's 34th congressional district election
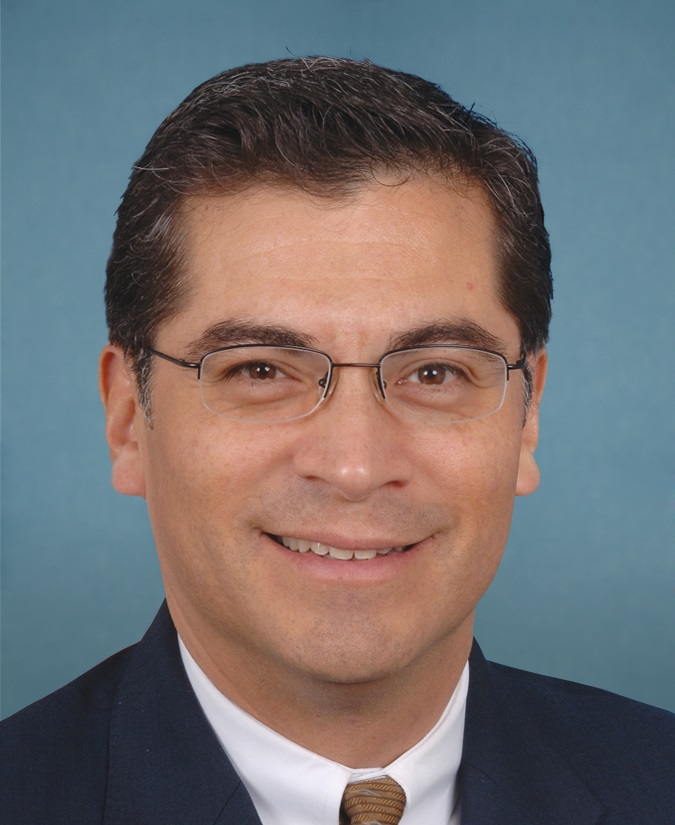

Nominee	Xavier Becerra	Adrienne Nicole Edwards
Party	Democratic	Democratic
Popular vote	122,842	36,314
Percentage	77.2%	22.8%
U.S. Representative before election
Xavier Becerra
Democratic
Elected U.S. Representative
Xavier Becerra
Democratic

The 34th district is based in central Los Angeles and includes Chinatown and Downtown Los Angeles. Incumbent Democrat Xavier Becerra, who had represented the 34th district since 2013 and previously represented the 31st district from 2003 to 2013 and the 30th district from 1993 to 2003, ran for re-election.

=== Primary election ===
==== Democratic candidates ====
===== Advanced to general =====
- Xavier Becerra, incumbent U.S. Representative
- Adrienne Nicole Edwards, housing counselor and candidate for this seat in 2014

===== Eliminated in primary =====
- Kenneth Mejia, certified public accountant

==== Endorsements ====
Xavier Becerra (D)

Labor unions

- AFL-CIO

Organizations

- California Democratic Party

==== Results ====
Nonpartisan blanket primary results
Party	Candidate	Votes	%
Democratic	Xavier Becerra (incumbent)	71,982	77.6
Democratic	Adrienne Nicole Edwards	19,624	21.2
Democratic	Kenneth Mejia (write-in)	1,177	1.3
Total votes		92,783	100.0

=== General election ===
==== Predictions ====
Source	Ranking	As of
The Cook Political Report	Safe D	November 7, 2016
Daily Kos Elections	Safe D	November 7, 2016
Rothenberg	Safe D	November 3, 2016
Sabato's Crystal Ball	Safe D	November 7, 2016
RCP	Safe D	October 31, 2016

==== Endorsements ====
Xavier Becerra (D)

Labor unions

- AFL-CIO
- International Brotherhood of Boilermakers

Organizations

- Equality California

==== Results ====
California's 34th congressional district election, 2016
Party	Candidate	Votes	%
Democratic	Xavier Becerra (incumbent)	122,842	77.2
Democratic	Adrienne Nicole Edwards	36,314	22.8
Total votes		159,156	100.0
Democratic hold			

== District 35 ==
2016 California's 35th congressional district election
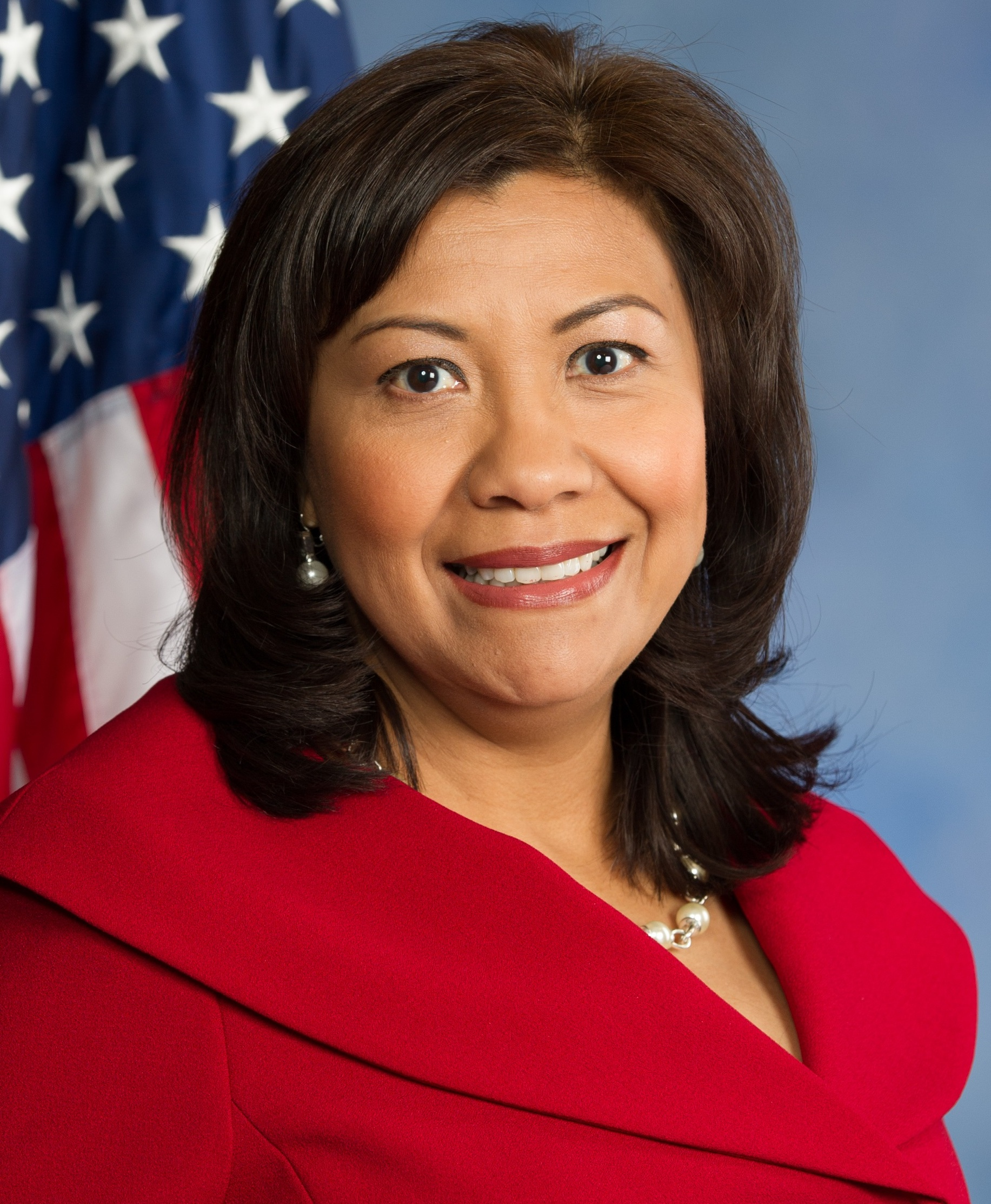

Nominee	Norma Torres	Tyler Fischella
Party	Democratic	Republican
Popular vote	124,044	47,309
Percentage	72.4%	27.6%
- County results Torres: 70–80%
U.S. Representative before election
Norma Torres
Democratic
Elected U.S. Representative
Norma Torres
Democratic

The 35th district is based in the Inland Empire and includes Fontana, Ontario, and Pomona. Incumbent Democrat Norma Torres, who had represented the 35th district since 2015, ran for re-election.

=== Primary election ===
==== Democratic candidates ====
===== Advanced to general =====
- Norma Torres, incumbent U.S. Representative

==== Republican candidates ====
===== Advanced to general =====
- Tyler Fischella, business development associate

==== Endorsements ====
Norma Torres (D)

Labor unions

- AFL-CIO

Organizations

- California Democratic Party

==== Results ====
Nonpartisan blanket primary results
Party	Candidate	Votes	%
Democratic	Norma Torres (incumbent)	65,226	75.6
Republican	Tyler Fischella	21,089	24.4
Total votes		86,315	100.0

=== General election ===
==== Predictions ====
Source	Ranking	As of
The Cook Political Report	Safe D	November 7, 2016
Daily Kos Elections	Safe D	November 7, 2016
Rothenberg	Safe D	November 3, 2016
Sabato's Crystal Ball	Safe D	November 7, 2016
RCP	Safe D	October 31, 2016

==== Endorsements ====
Norma Torres (D)

Labor unions

- AFL-CIO
- Communications Workers of America
- International Brotherhood of Boilermakers

Organizations

- Equality California

==== Results ====
California's 35th congressional district election, 2016
Party	Candidate	Votes	%
Democratic	Norma Torres (incumbent)	124,044	72.4
Republican	Tyler Fischella	47,309	27.6
Total votes		171,353	100.0
Democratic hold			

== District 36 ==
2016 California's 36th congressional district election
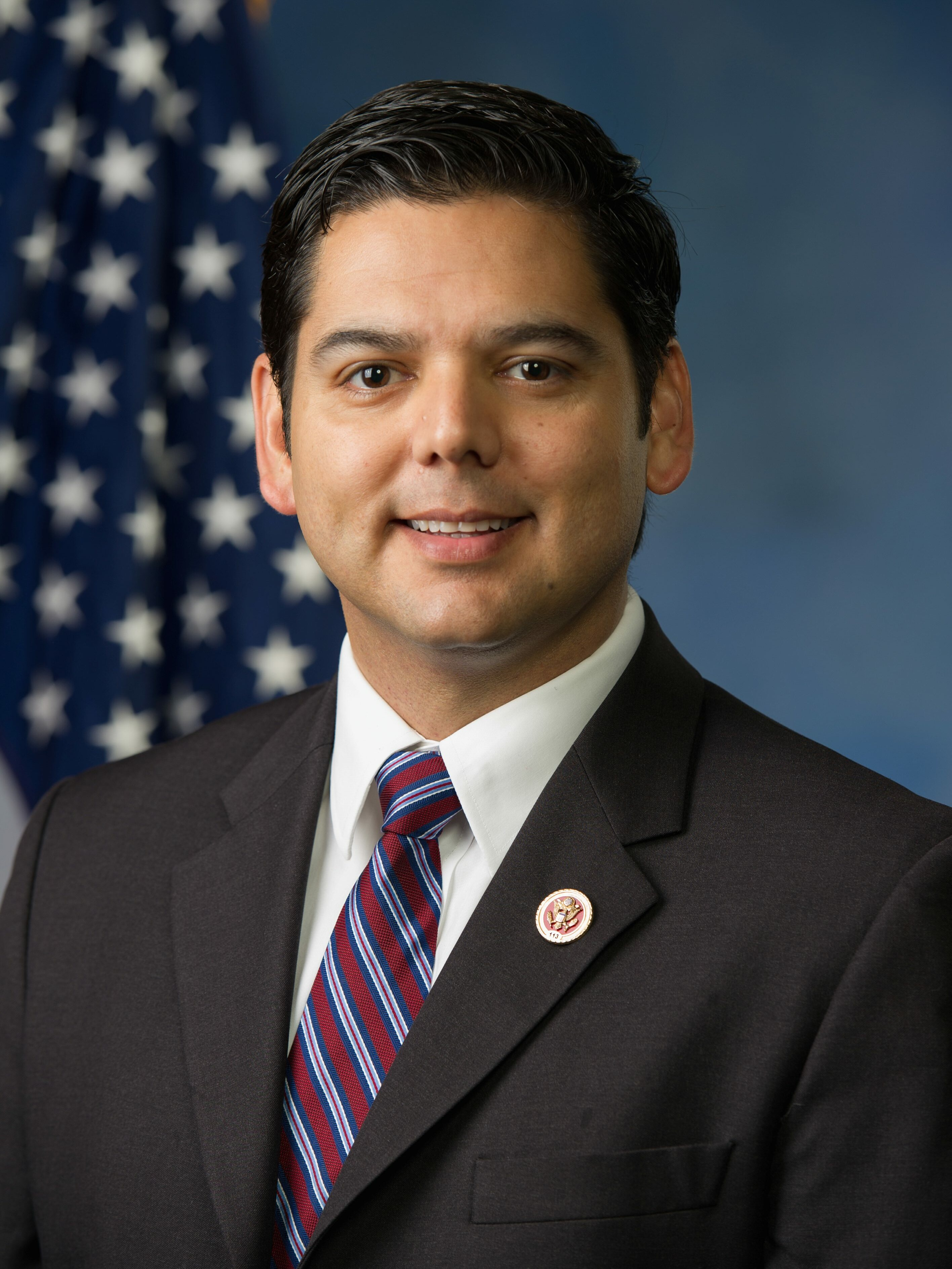

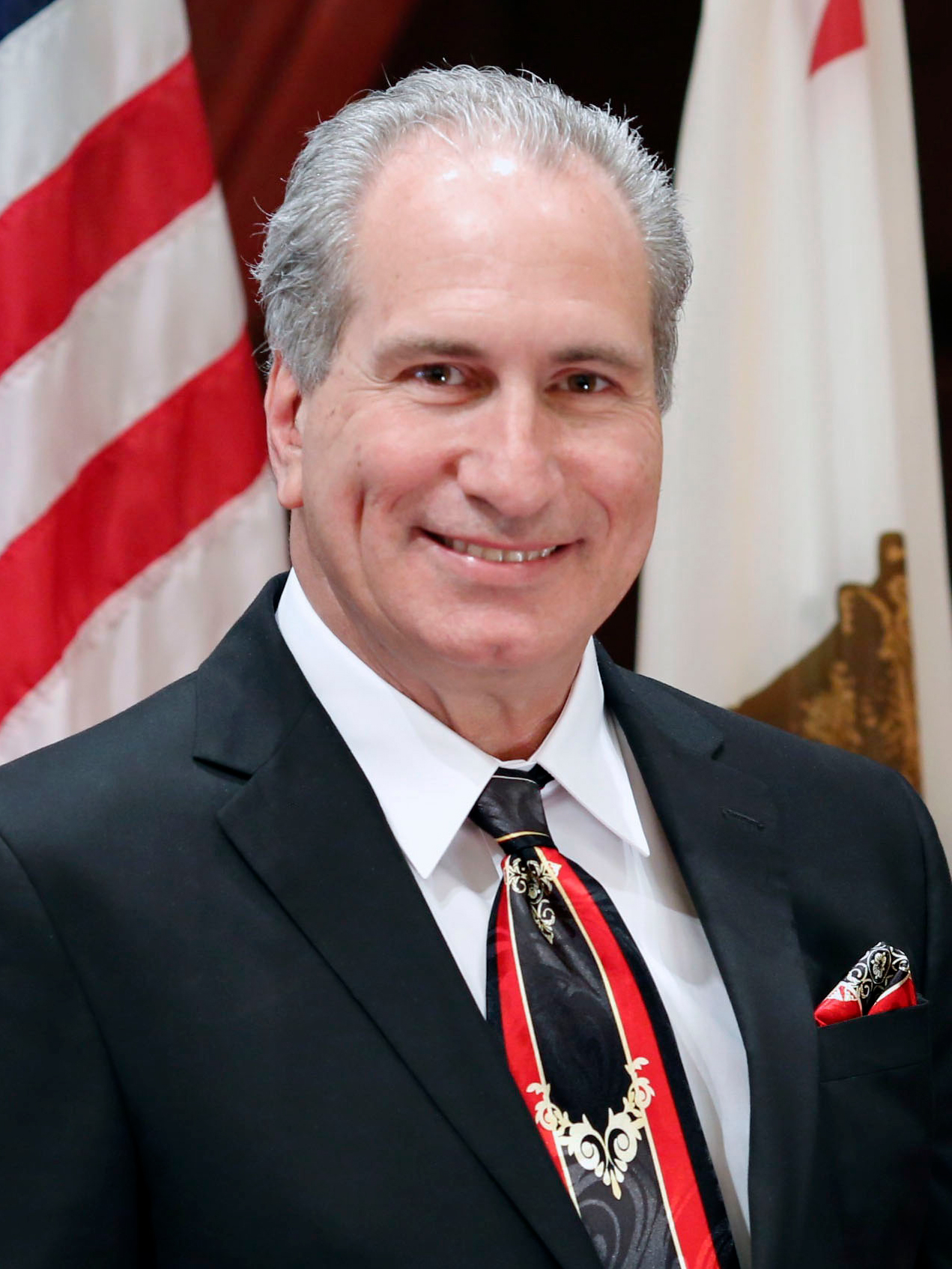
Nominee	Raul Ruiz	Jeff Stone
Party	Democratic	Republican
Popular vote	144,348	88,269
Percentage	62.1%	37.9%
- County results Ruiz: 60–70%
U.S. Representative before election
Raul Ruiz
Democratic
Elected U.S. Representative
Raul Ruiz
Democratic

The 36th district is based in eastern Riverside County and includes Palm Springs. Incumbent Democrat Raul Ruiz, who had represented the 36th district since 2013, ran for re-election.

=== Primary election ===
==== Democratic candidates ====
===== Advanced to general =====
- Raul Ruiz, incumbent U.S. Representative

==== Republican candidates ====
===== Advanced to general =====
- Jeff Stone, state senator

===== Eliminated in primary =====
- Stephan Wolkowicz, financial accountant

===== Withdrawn =====
- Dwight Kealy, attorney and former Marine intelligence officer (endorsed Stone)
- Lupe Ramos Watson, Mayor of Indio

==== Endorsements ====
Raul Ruiz (D)

Labor unions

- AFL-CIO

Organizations

- California Democratic Party

==== Results ====
Nonpartisan blanket primary results
Party	Candidate	Votes	%
Democratic	Raul Ruiz (incumbent)	76,213	58.5
Republican	Jeff Stone	41,190	31.6
Republican	Stephan "Steven" Wolkowicz	12,923	9.9
Total votes		130,326	100.0

=== General election ===
==== Predictions ====
Source	Ranking	As of
The Cook Political Report	Safe D	November 7, 2016
Daily Kos Elections	Safe D	November 7, 2016
Rothenberg	Safe D	November 3, 2016
Sabato's Crystal Ball	Safe D	November 7, 2016
RCP	Safe D	October 31, 2016

==== Endorsements ====
Raul Ruiz (D)

Labor unions

- AFL-CIO
- Communications Workers of America
- International Brotherhood of Boilermakers

Organizations

- Democratic Congressional Campaign Committee "Frontline" Program
- End Citizens United
- Equality California

==== Results ====
California's 36th congressional district election, 2016
Party	Candidate	Votes	%
Democratic	Raul Ruiz (incumbent)	144,348	62.1
Republican	Jeff Stone	88,269	37.9
Total votes		232,617	100.0
Democratic hold			

== District 37 ==
2016 California's 37th congressional district election
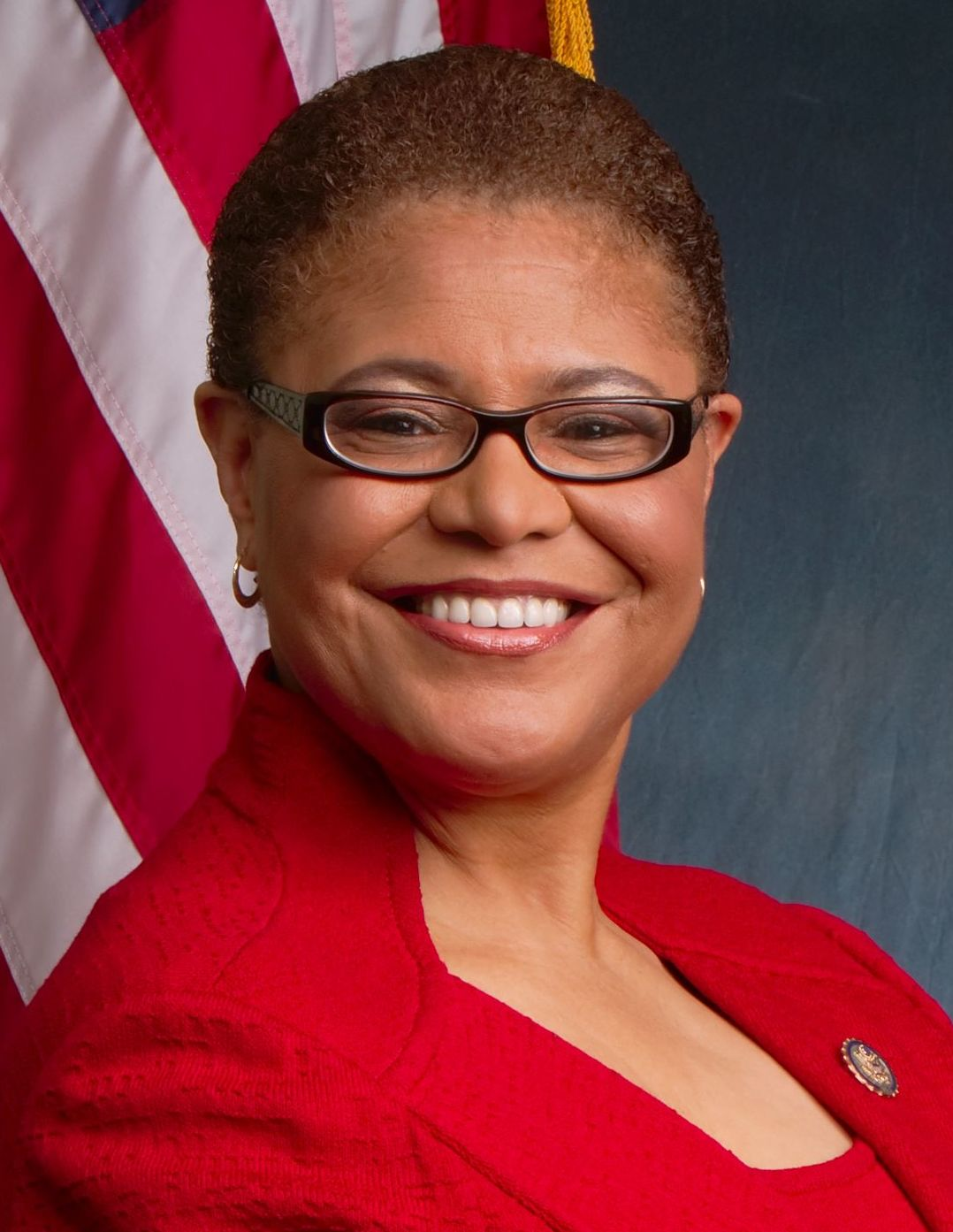

Nominee	Karen Bass	Chris Blake Wiggins
Party	Democratic	Democratic
Popular vote	192,490	44,782
Percentage	81.1%	18.9%
U.S. Representative before election
Karen Bass
Democratic
Elected U.S. Representative
Karen Bass
Democratic

The 37th district is based in West Los Angeles and includes Crenshaw and Culver City. Incumbent Democrat Karen Bass, who had represented the 37th district since 2013 and previously represented the 33rd district from 2011 to 2013, ran for re-election.

=== Primary election ===
==== Democratic candidates ====
===== Advanced to general =====
- Karen Bass, incumbent U.S. Representative

===== Eliminated in primary =====
- Chris Blake Wiggins, human resources recruiter

==== Republican candidates ====
===== Advanced to general =====
- Shariff A. Hasan, social entrepreneur

==== Endorsements ====
Karen Bass (D)

Labor unions

- AFL-CIO

Organizations

- California Democratic Party

==== Results ====
Nonpartisan blanket primary results
Party	Candidate	Votes	%
Democratic	Karen Bass (incumbent)	115,597	80.2
Democratic	Chris Blake Wiggins	15,362	10.7
Republican	Shariff A. Hasan	13,158	9.1
Total votes		144,117	100.0

=== General election ===
==== Predictions ====
Source	Ranking	As of
The Cook Political Report	Safe D	November 7, 2016
Daily Kos Elections	Safe D	November 7, 2016
Rothenberg	Safe D	November 3, 2016
Sabato's Crystal Ball	Safe D	November 7, 2016
RCP	Safe D	October 31, 2016

==== Endorsements ====
Karen Bass (D)

Labor unions

- AFL-CIO
- International Brotherhood of Boilermakers

Organizations

- Equality California

==== Results ====
California's 37th congressional district election, 2016
Party	Candidate	Votes	%
Democratic	Karen Bass (incumbent)	192,490	81.1
Democratic	Chris Blake Wiggins	44,782	18.9
Total votes		237,272	100.0
Democratic hold			

== District 38 ==
2016 California's 38th congressional district election
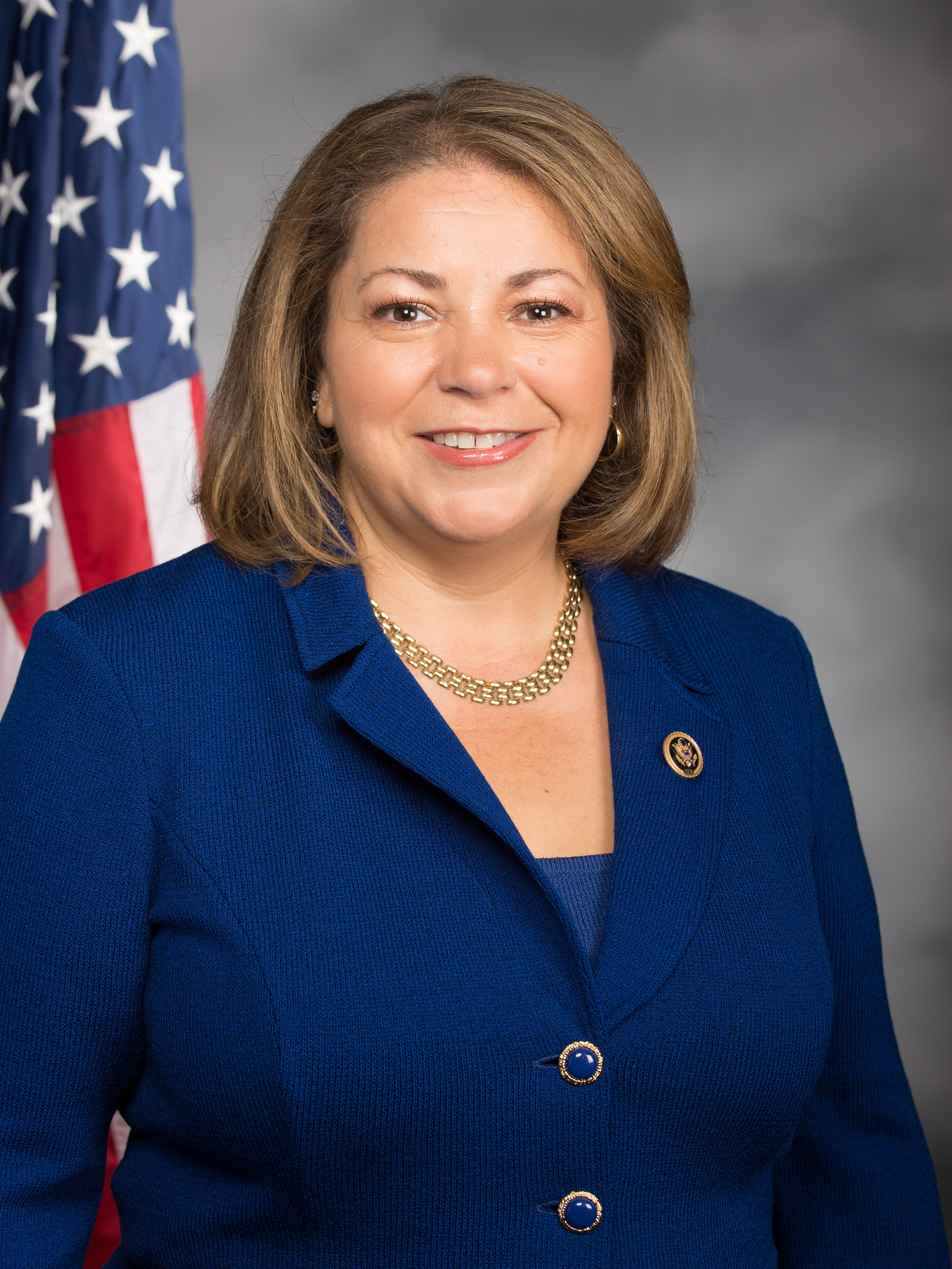

Nominee	Linda Sánchez	Ryan Downing
Party	Democratic	Republican
Popular vote	163,590	68,524
Percentage	70.5%	29.5%
- County results Sánchez: 50–60% 70–80%
U.S. Representative before election
Linda Sánchez
Democratic
Elected U.S. Representative
Linda Sánchez
Democratic

The 38th district is based in the eastern Los Angeles suburbs and includes Norwalk and Whittier. Incumbent Democrat Linda Sánchez, who had represented the 38th district since 2013 and previously represented the 39th district from 2003 to 2013, ran for re-election.

=== Primary election ===
==== Democratic candidates ====
===== Advanced to general =====
- Linda Sánchez, incumbent U.S. Representative

==== Republican candidates ====
===== Advanced to general =====
- Ryan Downing, evangelist and community organizer

==== Independent candidates ====
===== Eliminated in primary =====
- Scott Michael Adams, structural engineer

==== Endorsements ====
Linda Sánchez (D)

Labor unions

- AFL-CIO

Organizations

- California Democratic Party

==== Results ====
Nonpartisan blanket primary results
Party	Candidate	Votes	%
Democratic	Linda Sánchez (incumbent)	86,396	70.0
Republican	Ryan Downing	25,801	20.9
No party preference	Scott Michael Adams	11,189	9.1
Total votes		123,386	100.0

=== General election ===
==== Predictions ====
Source	Ranking	As of
The Cook Political Report	Safe D	November 7, 2016
Daily Kos Elections	Safe D	November 7, 2016
Rothenberg	Safe D	November 3, 2016
Sabato's Crystal Ball	Safe D	November 7, 2016
RCP	Safe D	October 31, 2016

==== Endorsements ====
Linda Sánchez (D)

Labor unions

- AFL-CIO
- Communications Workers of America
- International Brotherhood of Boilermakers

Organizations

- Equality California

==== Results ====
California's 38th congressional district election, 2016
Party	Candidate	Votes	%
Democratic	Linda Sánchez (incumbent)	163,590	70.5
Republican	Ryan Downing	68,524	29.5
Total votes		232,114	100.0
Democratic hold			

== District 39 ==
2016 California's 39th congressional district election
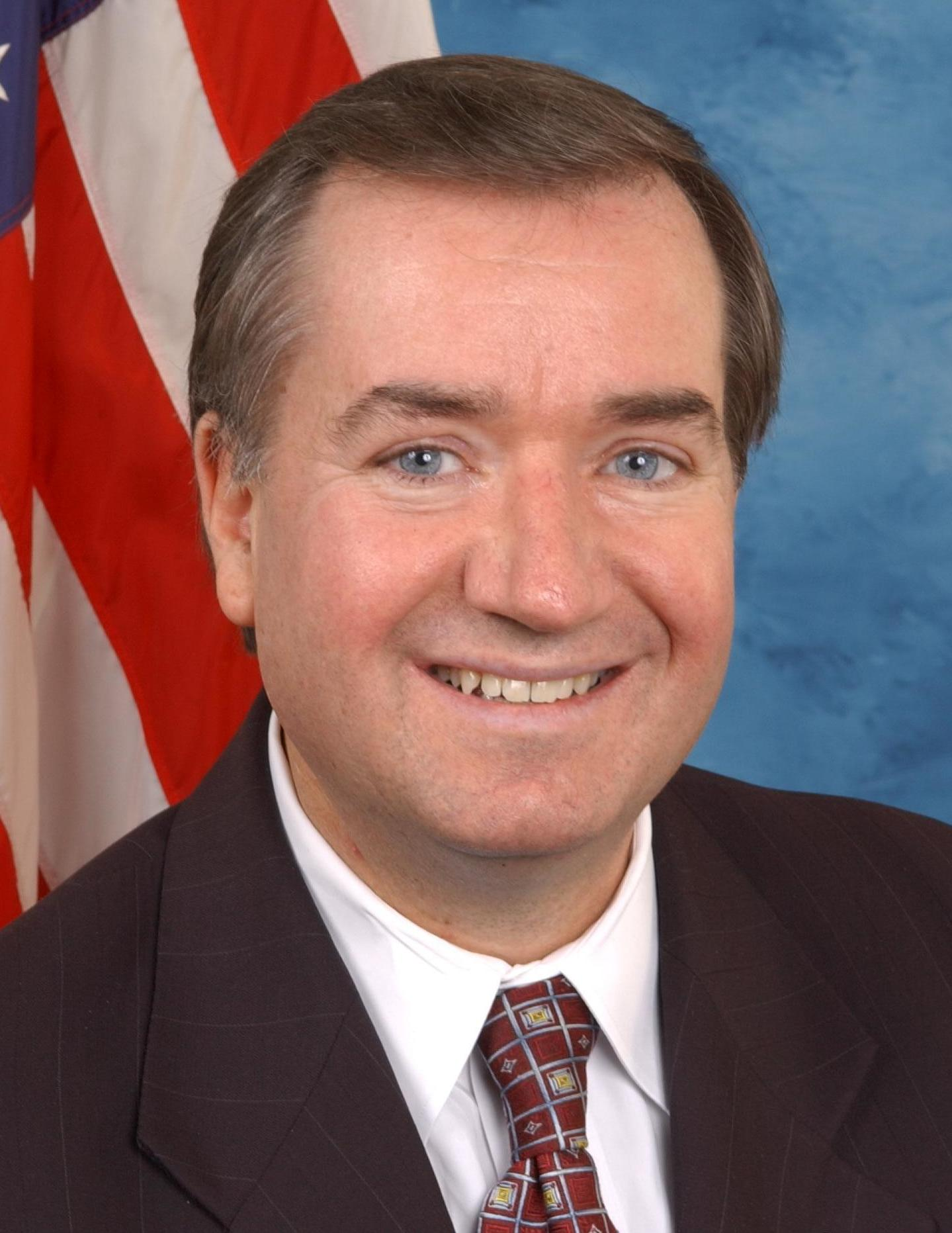

Nominee	Ed Royce	Brett Murdock
Party	Republican	Democratic
Popular vote	150,777	112,679
Percentage	57.6%	42.4%
- County results Royce: 50–60% 60–70%
U.S. Representative before election
Ed Royce
Republican
Elected U.S. Representative
Ed Royce
Republican

The 39th district straddles the Los Angeles–Orange county border and includes Chino Hills, Diamond Bar, and Fullerton. Incumbent Republican Ed Royce, who had represented the 39th district since 2013 and previously represented the 40th district from 2003 to 2013 and the 39th district from 1993 to 2003, ran for re-election.

=== Primary election ===
==== Republican candidates ====
===== Advanced to general =====
- Ed Royce, incumbent U.S. Representative

==== Democratic candidates ====
===== Advanced to general =====
- Brett Murdock, former mayor of Brea

==== Endorsements ====
Brett Murdock (D)

Labor unions

- AFL-CIO

Organizations

- California Democratic Party

==== Results ====
Nonpartisan blanket primary results
Party	Candidate	Votes	%
Republican	Ed Royce (incumbent)	85,035	60.5
Democratic	Brett Murdock	55,520	39.5
Total votes		140,555	100.0

=== General election ===
==== Predictions ====
Source	Ranking	As of
The Cook Political Report	Safe R	November 7, 2016
Daily Kos Elections	Safe R	November 7, 2016
Rothenberg	Safe R	November 3, 2016
Sabato's Crystal Ball	Safe R	November 7, 2016
RCP	Safe R	October 31, 2016

==== Endorsements ====
Ed Royce (R)

Organizations

- Campaign for Working Families
Brett Murdock (D)

Labor unions

- AFL-CIO
- International Brotherhood of Boilermakers

==== Results ====
California's 39th congressional district election, 2016
Party	Candidate	Votes	%
Republican	Ed Royce (incumbent)	150,777	57.6
Democratic	Brett Murdock	112,679	42.4
Total votes		263,456	100.0
Republican hold			

== District 40 ==
2016 California's 40th congressional district election
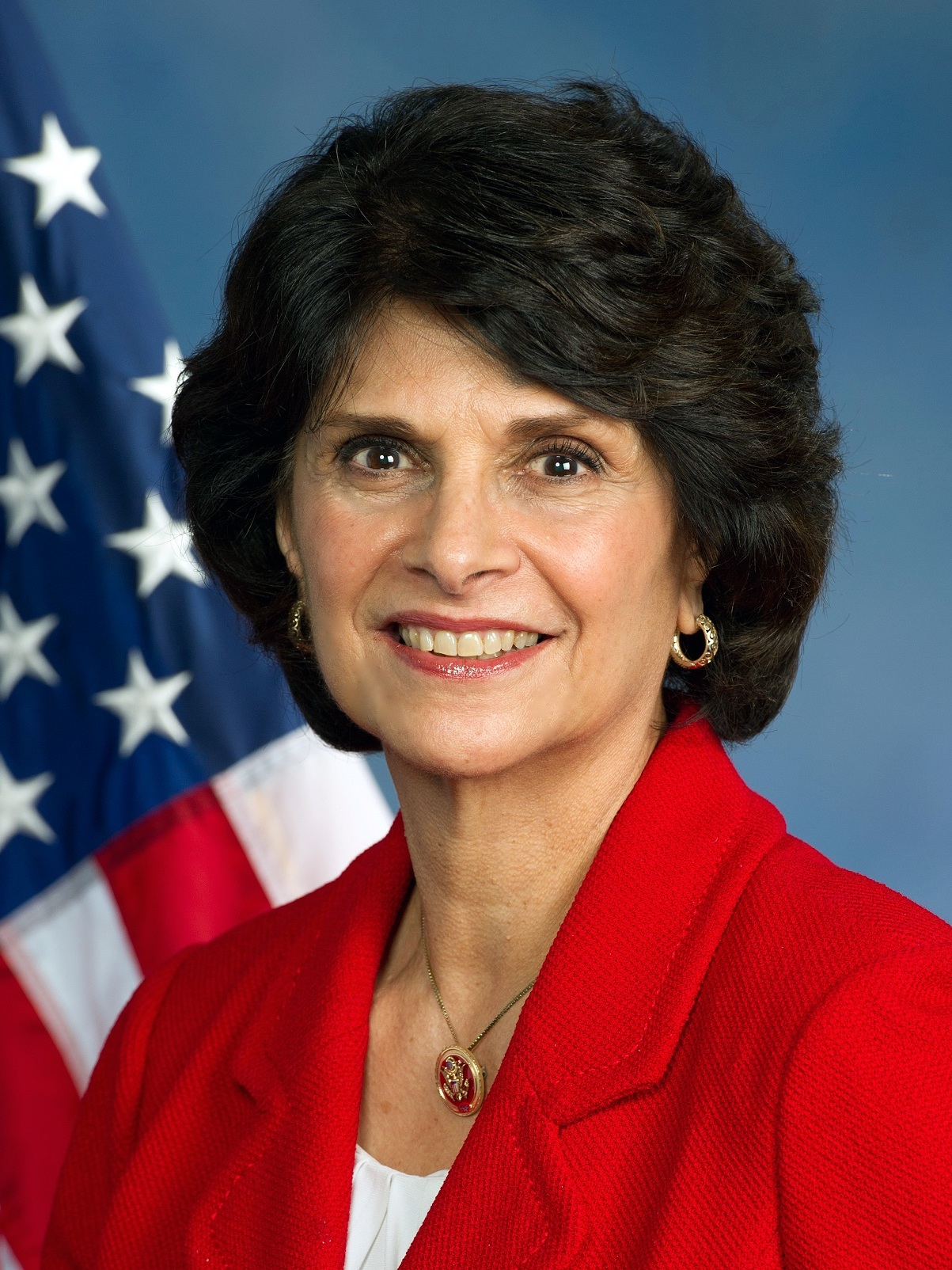

Nominee	Lucille Roybal-Allard	Roman Gabriel Gonzalez
Party	Democratic	No party preference
Popular vote	106,554	42,743
Percentage	71.4%	28.6%
- County results Roybal-allard: 70–80%
U.S. Representative before election
Lucille Roybal-Allard
Democratic
Elected U.S. Representative
Lucille Roybal-Allard
Democratic

The 40th district is based in central Los Angeles County and includes Downey and East Los Angeles. Incumbent Democrat Lucille Roybal-Allard, who had represented the 40th district since 2013 and previously represented the 34th district from 2003 to 2013 and the 33rd district from 1993 to 2003, ran for re-election.

=== Primary election ===
==== Democratic candidates ====
===== Advanced to general =====
- Lucille Roybal-Allard, incumbent U.S. Representative

===== Eliminated in primary =====
- J. Cesar Flores

==== Independent candidates ====
===== Advanced to general =====
- Roman Gabriel Gonzalez, medical technician

==== Endorsements ====
Lucille Roybal-Allard (D)

Labor unions

- AFL-CIO

Organizations

- California Democratic Party

==== Results ====
Nonpartisan blanket primary results
Party	Candidate	Votes	%
Democratic	Lucille Roybal-Allard (incumbent)	60,691	76.3
No party preference	Roman Gabriel Gonzalez	18,844	23.7
Democratic	J. Cesar Flores (write-in)	6	0.0
Total votes		79,541	100.0

=== General election ===
==== Predictions ====
Source	Ranking	As of
The Cook Political Report	Safe D	November 7, 2016
Daily Kos Elections	Safe D	November 7, 2016
Rothenberg	Safe D	November 3, 2016
Sabato's Crystal Ball	Safe D	November 7, 2016
RCP	Safe D	October 31, 2016

==== Endorsements ====
Lucille Roybal-Allard (D)

Labor unions

- AFL-CIO
- Communications Workers of America
- International Brotherhood of Boilermakers

Organizations

- Equality California

==== Results ====
California's 40th congressional district election, 2016
Party	Candidate	Votes	%
Democratic	Lucille Roybal-Allard (incumbent)	106,554	71.4
No party preference	Roman Gabriel Gonzalez	42,743	28.6
Total votes		149,297	100.0
Democratic hold			

== District 41 ==
2016 California's 41st congressional district election
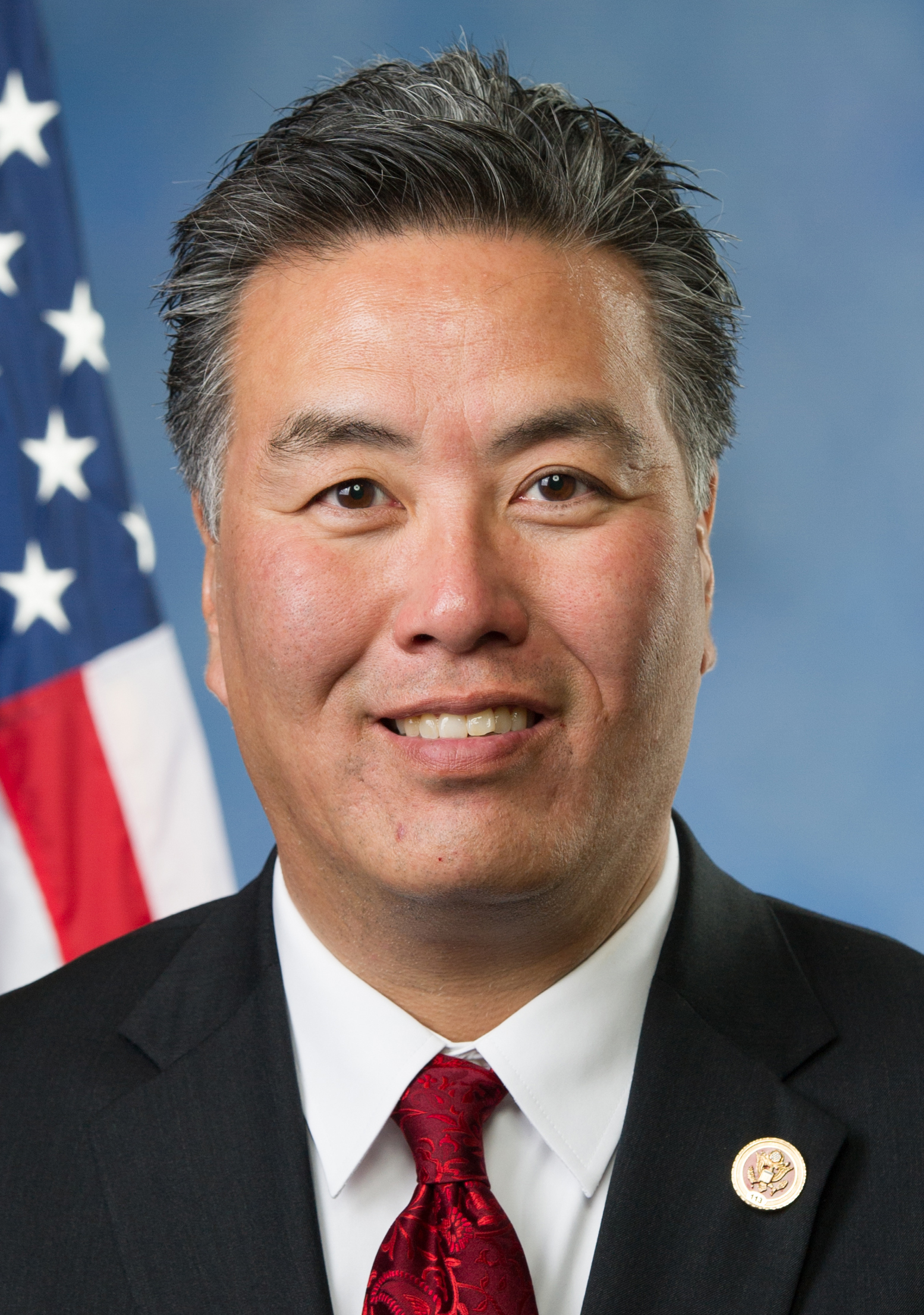

Nominee	Mark Takano	Doug Shepherd
Party	Democratic	Republican
Popular vote	128,164	69,159
Percentage	65.0%	35.0%
- County results Takano: 60–70%
U.S. Representative before election
Mark Takano
Democratic
Elected U.S. Representative
Mark Takano
Democratic

The 41st district is based in the Inland Empire and includes Moreno Valley, Perris, and Riverside. Incumbent Democrat Mark Takano, who had represented the 41st district since 2013, ran for re-election.

=== Primary election ===
==== Democratic candidates ====
===== Advanced to general =====
- Mark Takano, incumbent U.S. Representative

==== Republican candidates ====
===== Advanced to general =====
- Doug Shepherd, realtor

===== Eliminated in primary =====
- Randy Fox, businessman and pastor
- Cody Ryan, fitness entrepreneur and investor

==== Endorsements ====
Mark Takano (D)

Labor unions

- AFL-CIO

Organizations

- California Democratic Party

==== Results ====
Nonpartisan blanket primary results
Party	Candidate	Votes	%
Democratic	Mark Takano (incumbent)	63,706	64.5
Republican	Doug Shepherd	17,255	17.5
Republican	Randy Fox	14,844	15.0
Republican	Cody Ryan	2,893	2.9
Total votes		98,698	100.0

=== General election ===
==== Predictions ====
Source	Ranking	As of
The Cook Political Report	Safe D	November 7, 2016
Daily Kos Elections	Safe D	November 7, 2016
Rothenberg	Safe D	November 3, 2016
Sabato's Crystal Ball	Safe D	November 7, 2016
RCP	Safe D	October 31, 2016

==== Endorsements ====
Mark Takano (D)

Labor unions

- AFL-CIO
- Communications Workers of America
- International Brotherhood of Boilermakers
- Service Employees International Union

Organizations

- End Citizens United
- Equality California

==== Results ====
California's 41st congressional district election, 2016
Party	Candidate	Votes	%
Democratic	Mark Takano (incumbent)	128,164	65.0
Republican	Doug Shepherd	69,159	35.0
Total votes		197,323	100.0
Democratic hold			

== District 42 ==
2016 California's 42nd congressional district election
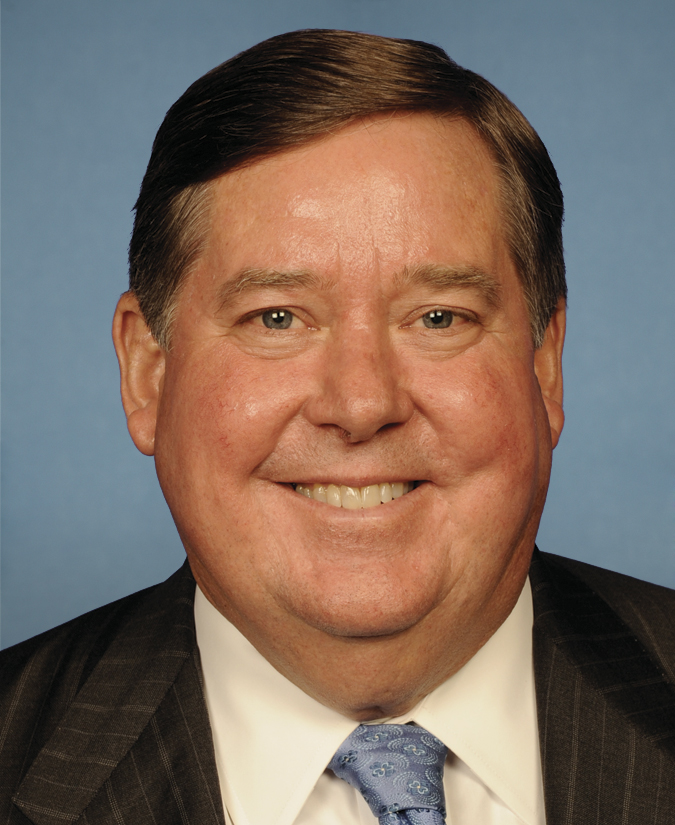

Nominee	Ken Calvert	Tim Sheridan
Party	Republican	Democratic
Popular vote	149,547	104,689
Percentage	58.8%	41.2%
- County results Calvert: 50–60%
U.S. Representative before election
Ken Calvert
Republican
Elected U.S. Representative
Ken Calvert
Republican

The 42nd district is based in the Inland Empire and includes Corona and Murrieta. Incumbent Republican Ken Calvert, who had represented the 42nd district since 2013 and previously represented the 44th district from 2003 to 2013 and the 43rd district from 1993 to 2003, ran for re-election.

=== Primary election ===
==== Republican candidates ====
===== Advanced to general =====
- Ken Calvert, incumbent U.S. Representative

==== Democratic candidates ====
===== Advanced to general =====
- Tim Sheridan, attorney and general election candidate for this seat in 2014

==== Independent candidates ====
===== Eliminated in primary =====
- Kerri Condley, businesswomen, former delegate for the California Democratic Party and Democratic candidate for this seat in 2014

==== Endorsements ====
Tim Sheridan (D)

Labor unions

- AFL-CIO

Organizations

- California Democratic Party

==== Results ====
Nonpartisan blanket primary results
Party	Candidate	Votes	%
Republican	Ken Calvert (incumbent)	66,418	54.9
Democratic	Tim Sheridan	45,389	37.5
No party preference	Kerri Condley	9,076	7.5
Total votes		120,883	100.0

=== General election ===
==== Predictions ====
Source	Ranking	As of
The Cook Political Report	Safe R	November 7, 2016
Daily Kos Elections	Safe R	November 7, 2016
Rothenberg	Safe R	November 3, 2016
Sabato's Crystal Ball	Safe R	November 7, 2016
RCP	Safe R	October 31, 2016

==== Endorsements ====
Ken Calvert (R)

Organizations

- Campaign for Working Families
Tim Sheridan (D)

Labor unions

- AFL-CIO
- International Brotherhood of Boilermakers
- Service Employees International Union

==== Results ====
California's 42nd congressional district election, 2016
Party	Candidate	Votes	%
Republican	Ken Calvert (incumbent)	149,547	58.8
Democratic	Tim Sheridan	104,689	41.2
Total votes		254,236	100.0
Republican hold			

== District 43 ==
2016 California's 43rd congressional district election
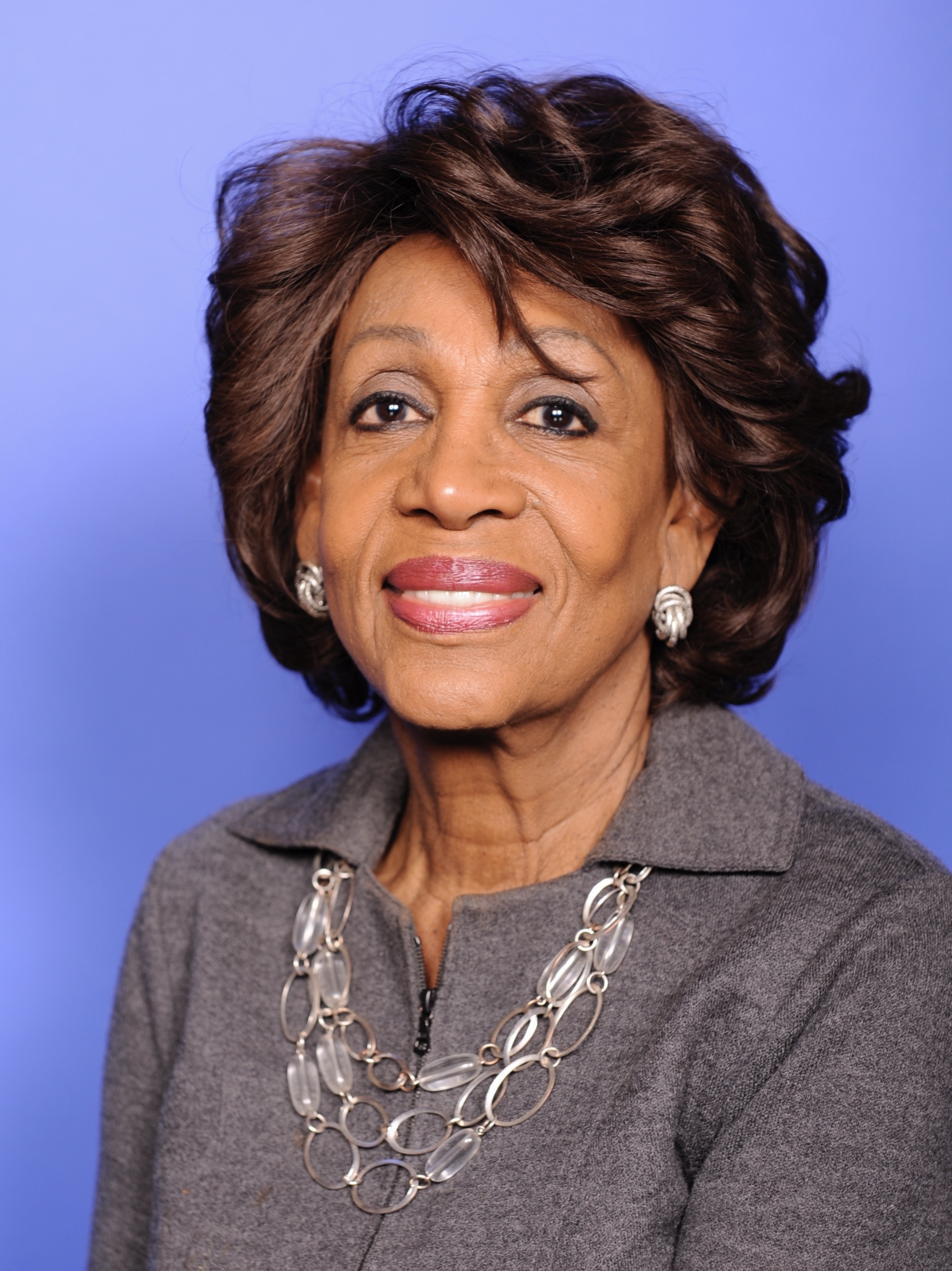

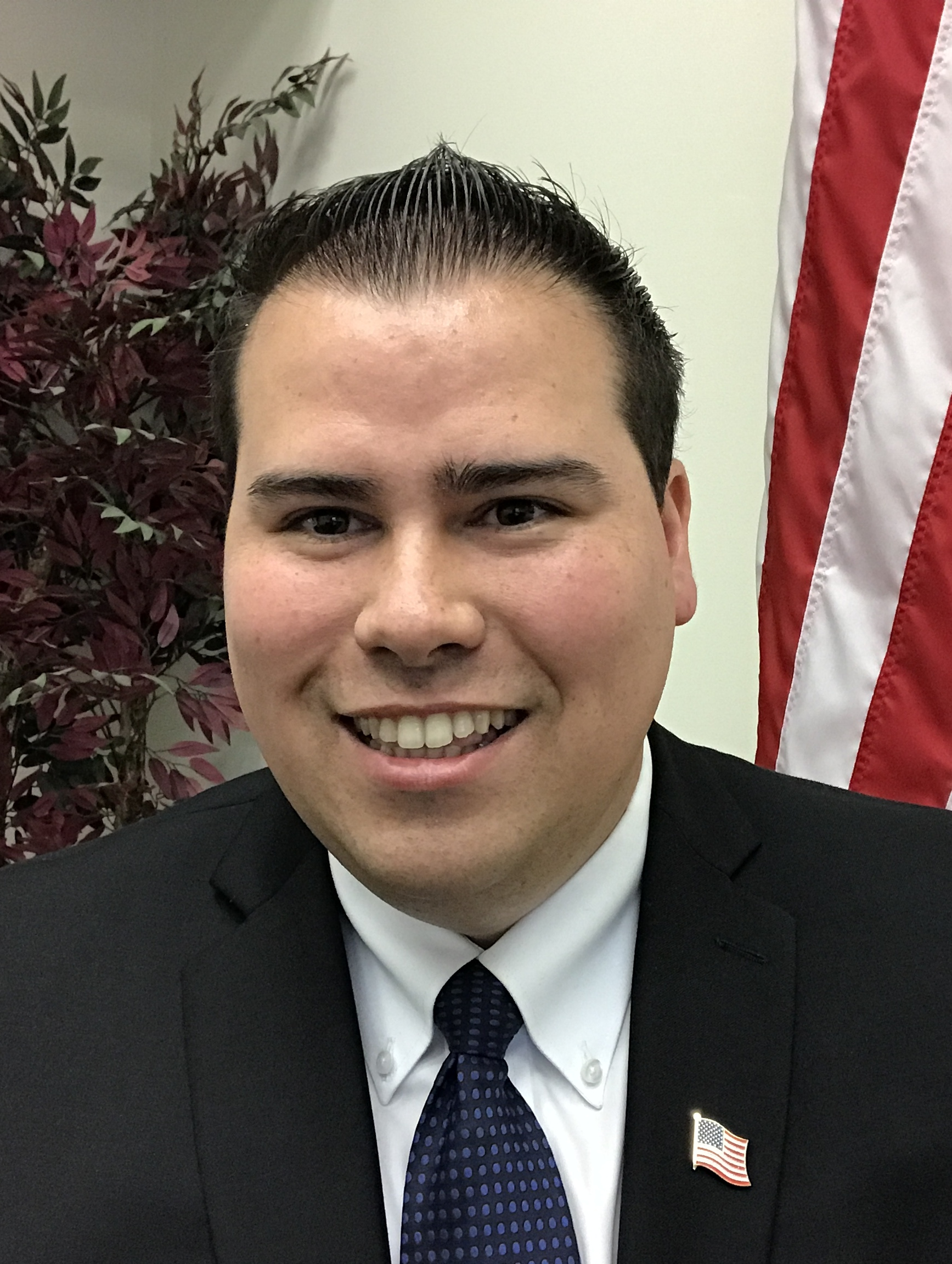
Nominee	Maxine Waters	Omar Navarro
Party	Democratic	Republican
Popular vote	167,017	29,152
Percentage	76.1%	23.9%
- County results Waters: 70–80%
U.S. Representative before election
Maxine Waters
Democratic
Elected U.S. Representative
Maxine Waters
Democratic

The 43rd district is based in South Los Angeles and includes Hawthorne and Inglewood. Incumbent Democrat Maxine Waters, who had represented the 43rd district since 2013 and previously represented the 35th district from 1993 to 2013 and the 29th district from 1991 to 1993, ran for re-election.

=== Primary election ===
==== Democratic candidates ====
===== Advanced to general =====
- Maxine Waters, incumbent U.S. Representative

==== Republican candidates ====
===== Advanced to general =====
- Omar Navarro, small business owner

==== Endorsements ====
Maxine Waters (D)

Labor unions

- AFL-CIO

Organizations

- California Democratic Party

==== Results ====
Nonpartisan blanket primary results
Party	Candidate	Votes	%
Democratic	Maxine Waters (incumbent)	92,909	76.1
Republican	Omar Navarro	29,152	23.9
Total votes		122,061	100.0

=== General election ===
==== Predictions ====
Source	Ranking	As of
The Cook Political Report	Safe D	November 7, 2016
Daily Kos Elections	Safe D	November 7, 2016
Rothenberg	Safe D	November 3, 2016
Sabato's Crystal Ball	Safe D	November 7, 2016
RCP	Safe D	October 31, 2016

==== Endorsements ====
Maxine Waters (D)

Labor unions

- AFL-CIO
- International Brotherhood of Boilermakers

Organizations

- Equality California

==== Results ====
California's 43rd congressional district election, 2016
Party	Candidate	Votes	%
Democratic	Maxine Waters (incumbent)	167,017	76.1
Republican	Omar Navarro	52,499	23.9
Total votes		219,516	100.0
Democratic hold			

== District 44 ==
2016 California's 44th congressional district election
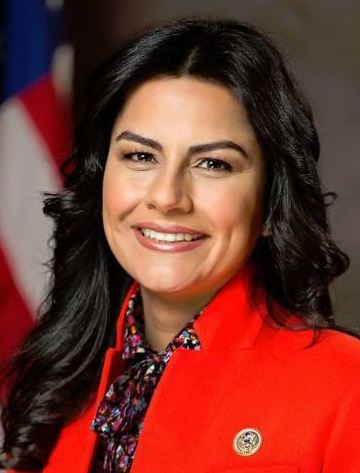

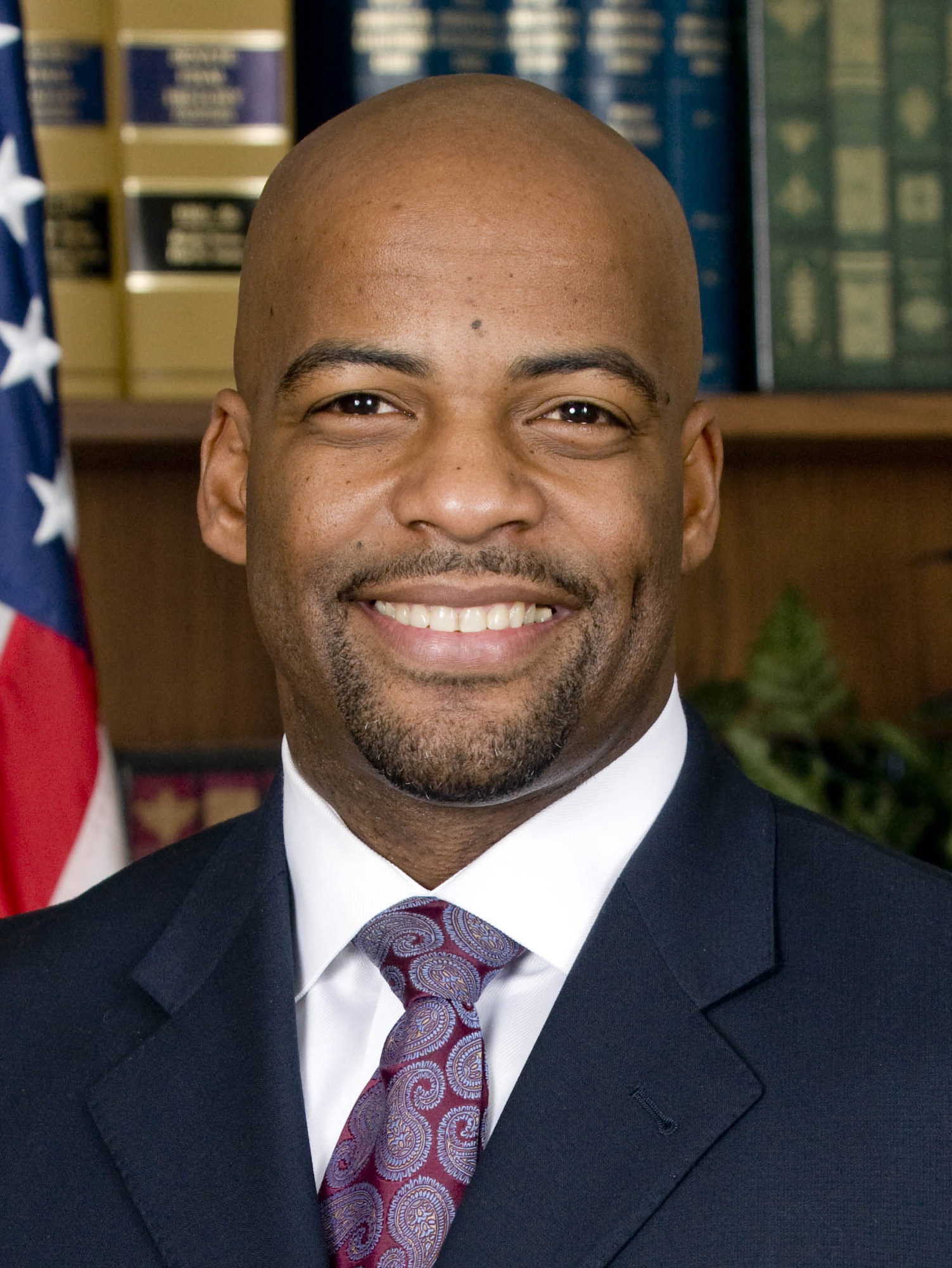
Nominee	Nanette Barragán	Isadore Hall, III
Party	Democratic	Democratic
Popular vote	93,124	85,289
Percentage	52.2%	47.8%
U.S. Representative before election
Janice Hahn
Democratic
Elected U.S. Representative
Nanette Barragán
Democratic

The 44th district is based in south Los Angeles County and includes Carson, Compton, and San Pedro. Incumbent Democrat Janice Hahn, who had represented the 44th district since 2013 and previously represented the 36th district from 2011 to 2013, retired to run for the Los Angeles County Board of Supervisors.

=== Primary election ===
==== Democratic candidates ====
===== Advanced to general =====
- Nanette Barragán, attorney and former Hermosa Beach City Council member
- Isadore Hall, III, state senator

===== Eliminated in primary =====
- Martha DelGadillo
- Morris Griffin, Los Angeles County maintenance worker
- Marcus Musante, lawyer
- Sylvia Ortiz, business owner
- Armando Sotomayor, community volunteer

===== Declined =====
- Carmen Avalos, South Gate City Clerk
- Aja Brown, Mayor of Compton
- Joe Buscaino, Los Angeles City Council member
- Maria Davila, South Gate City Council member
- Janice Hahn, incumbent U.S. Representative

==== Republican candidates ====
===== Eliminated in primary =====
- Christopher Castillo, clerk and carpenter
- Ronald Siegel, small business owner

==== Endorsements ====
Nanette Barragán (D)

U.S. Representatives

- Joaquin Castro, incumbent U.S. Representative (TX−20)
- Lois Frankel, incumbent U.S. Representative (FL−22)
- Ruben Gallego, incumbent U.S. Representative (AZ−7)
- Lucille Roybal-Allard, incumbent U.S. Representative (CA−40)
- Raul Ruiz, incumbent U.S. Representative (CA−36)
- Linda Sanchez, incumbent U.S. Representative (CA−38)
- Eric Swalwell, incumbent U.S. Representative (CA−15)

Organizations

- California League of Conservation Voters
- EMILY's List
- Latino Victory Project
- National Women's Political Caucus
- PODER PAC
- Progressive Change Campaign Committee
- Progressive Democrats of America

Local officials

- Belen Bernal, South Gate Council member
- Maria Davila, South Gate Council member
- Bill De Witt, South Gate Council member
- Henry Gonzalez, former South Gate Mayor
- Janice Schaffer, Carson Commissioner
Isadore Hall, III (D)

U.S. Representatives

- Janice Hahn, incumbent U.S. Representative (CA−44)

Labor unions

- AFL-CIO
- Communications Workers of America
- International Brotherhood of Boilermakers
- Service Employees International Union

Organizations

- California Democratic Party
- Equality California

==== Results ====
Nonpartisan blanket primary results
Party	Candidate	Votes	%
Democratic	Isadore Hall, III	40,200	40.1
Democratic	Nanette Barragán	22,031	22.0
Democratic	Armando Sotomayor	10,087	10.1
Democratic	Silvia Ortiz	6,062	6.0
Democratic	Martha C. Delgadillo	5,771	5.8
Republican	Ronald Siegel	5,565	5.5
Republican	Christopher Castillo	3,651	3.6
Democratic	Morris F. Griffin	3,624	3.6
Democratic	Marcus C. Musante	2,366	2.4
No party preference	Michael De Mauricio	919	0.9
Total votes		100,276	100.0

=== General election ===
==== Predictions ====
Source	Ranking	As of
The Cook Political Report	Safe D	November 7, 2016
Daily Kos Elections	Safe D	November 7, 2016
Rothenberg	Safe D	November 3, 2016
Sabato's Crystal Ball	Safe D	November 7, 2016
RCP	Safe D	October 31, 2016

==== Results ====
California's 44th congressional district election, 2016
Party	Candidate	Votes	%
Democratic	Nanette Barragán	93,124	52.2
Democratic	Isadore Hall, III	85,289	47.8
Total votes		178,413	100.0
Democratic hold			

== District 45 ==
2016 California's 45th congressional district election
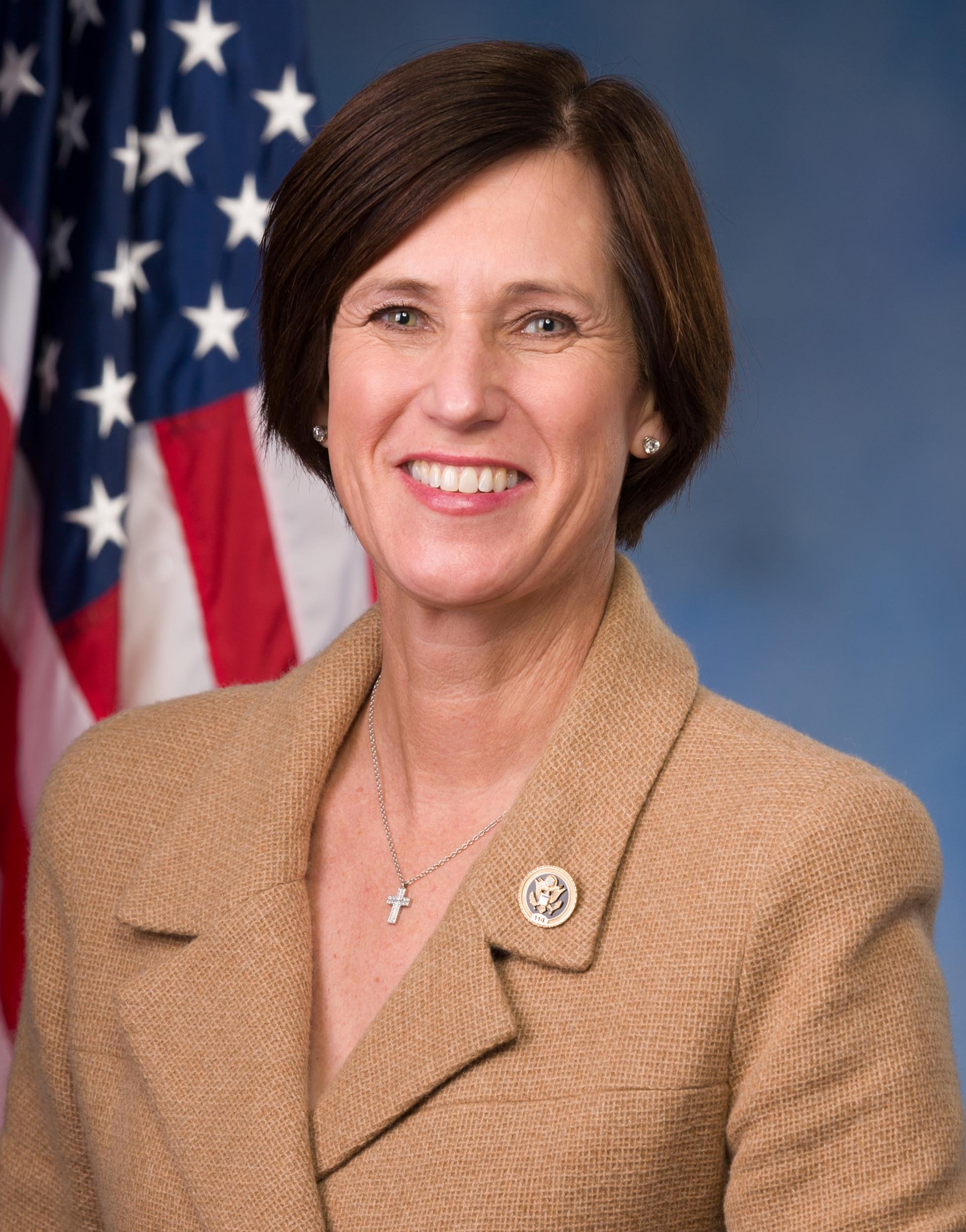

Nominee	Mimi Walters	Ron Varasteh
Party	Republican	Democratic
Popular vote	182,618	129,231
Percentage	58.6%	41.4%
- County results Walters: 50–60%
U.S. Representative before election
Mimi Walters
Republican
Elected U.S. Representative
Mimi Walters
Republican

The 45th district is based in inland Orange County and includes Irvine and Mission Viejo. Incumbent Republican Mimi Walters, who had represented the 45th district since 2015, ran for re-election.

=== Primary election ===
==== Republican candidates ====
===== Advanced to general =====
- Mimi Walters, incumbent U.S. Representative

===== Eliminated in primary =====
- Greg Raths, retired Marine colonel

==== Democratic candidates ====
===== Advanced to general =====
- Ron Varasteh, scientist, engineer and businessman

===== Eliminated in primary =====
- Max Gouron, physician anesthesiologist

==== Endorsements ====
Ron Varasteh (D)

Organizations

- California Democratic Party

==== Results ====
Nonpartisan blanket primary results
Party	Candidate	Votes	%
Republican	Mimi Walters (incumbent)	65,773	40.9
Democratic	Ron Varasteh	44,449	27.6
Republican	Greg Raths	30,961	19.2
Democratic	Max Gouron	19,716	12.3
Total votes		160,899	100.0

=== General election ===
==== Predictions ====
Source	Ranking	As of
The Cook Political Report	Safe R	November 7, 2016
Daily Kos Elections	Safe R	November 7, 2016
Rothenberg	Safe R	November 3, 2016
Sabato's Crystal Ball	Safe R	November 7, 2016
RCP	Safe R	October 31, 2016

==== Endorsements ====
Ron Varasteh (D)

Organizations

- Progressive Democrats of America

==== Results ====
California's 45th congressional district election, 2016
Party	Candidate	Votes	%
Republican	Mimi Walters (incumbent)	182,618	58.6
Democratic	Ron Varasteh	129,231	41.4
Total votes		311,849	100.0
Republican hold			

== District 46 ==
2016 California's 46th congressional district election
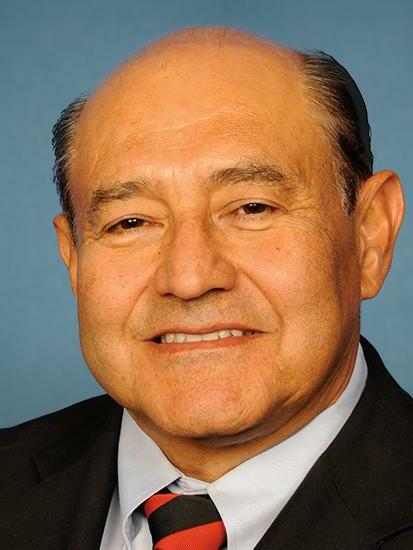

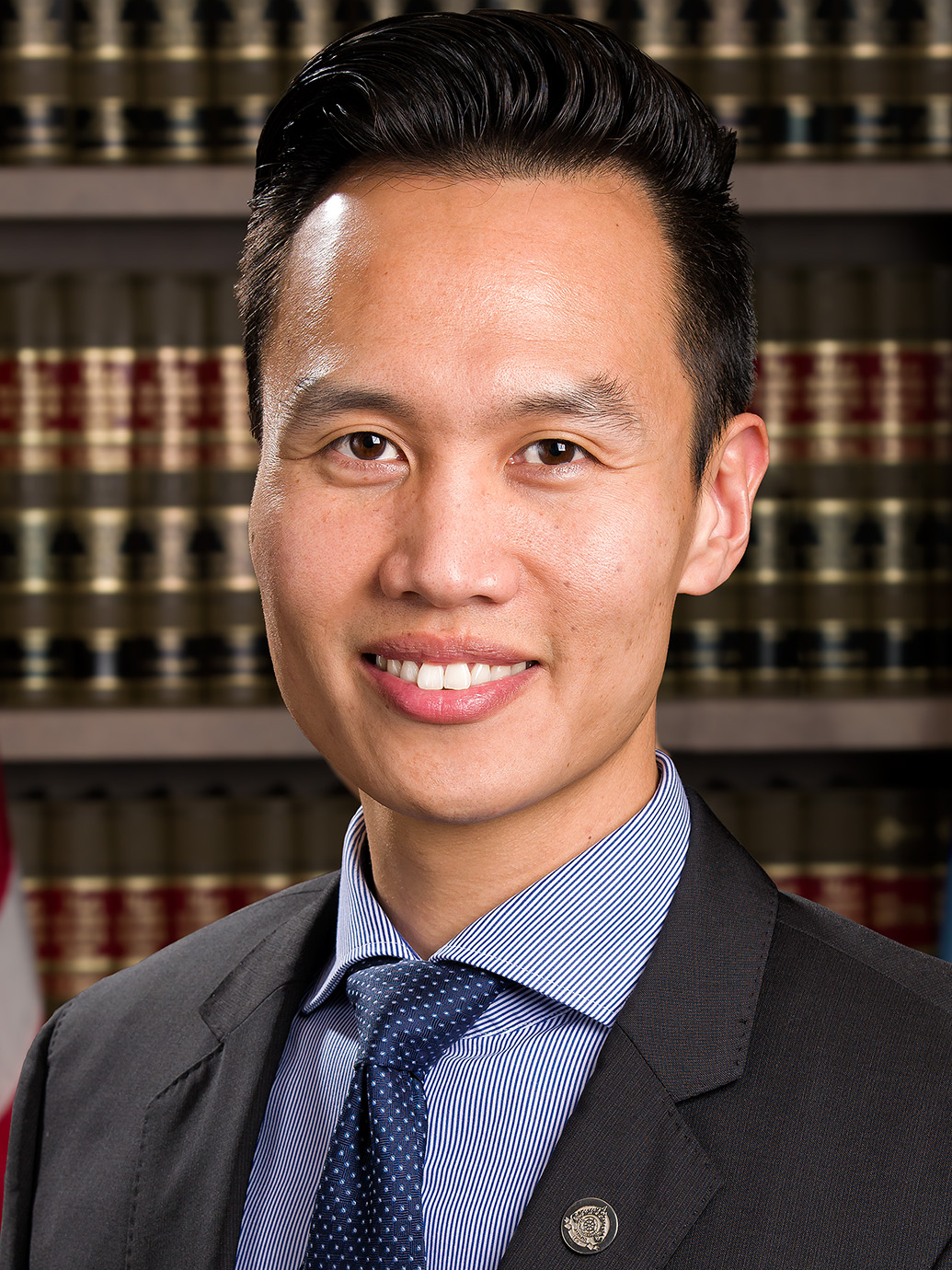
Nominee	Lou Correa	Bao Nguyen
Party	Democratic	Democratic
Popular vote	115,248	49,345
Percentage	70.0%	30.0%
U.S. Representative before election
Loretta Sanchez
Democratic
Elected U.S. Representative
Lou Correa
Democratic

The 46th district is based in central Orange County and includes Anaheim and Santa Ana. Incumbent Democrat Loretta Sanchez, who had represented the 46th district since 2013 and previously represented the 47th district from 2003 to 2013 and the 46th district from 1997 to 2003, retired to run for the United States Senate.

=== Primary election ===
==== Democratic candidates ====
===== Advanced to general =====
- Lou Correa, former state senator
- Bao Nguyen, Mayor of Garden Grove

===== Eliminated in primary =====
- Joe Dunn, former state senator

===== Withdrawn =====
- Jordan Brandman, Anaheim Council member
- Heberto Sanchez, manager with the Los Angeles County Department of Health (withdrew October 2015)

===== Declined =====
- Loretta Sanchez, incumbent U.S. Representative

==== Republican candidates ====
===== Eliminated in primary =====
- Louie Contreras, businessman and realtor
- Rodolfo Rudy Gaona, small business owner
- Bob Peterson, Orange County sheriff's commander
- Lynn Schott, educator, business owner and Irvine Council member

==== Endorsements ====
Joe Dunn (D)

Labor unions

- AFL-CIO
Bao Nguyen (D)

Labor unions

- Service Employees International Union

==== Results ====
Nonpartisan blanket primary results
Party	Candidate	Votes	%
Democratic	Lou Correa	40,880	43.7
Democratic	Bao Nguyen	13,625	14.6
Republican	Bob Peterson	11,781	12.6
Democratic	Joe Dunn	11,596	12.4
Republican	Lynn Schott	7,373	7.9
Republican	Louie A. Contreras	3,441	3.7
No party preference	Nancy Trinidad Marin	3,306	3.5
Republican	Rodolfo Rudy Gaona	1,567	1.7
Total votes		93,569	100.0

=== General election ===
==== Predictions ====
Source	Ranking	As of
The Cook Political Report	Safe D	November 7, 2016
Daily Kos Elections	Safe D	November 7, 2016
Rothenberg	Safe D	November 3, 2016
Sabato's Crystal Ball	Safe D	November 7, 2016
RCP	Safe D	October 31, 2016

==== Endorsements ====
Lou Correa (D)

Labor unions

- AFL-CIO
- International Brotherhood of Boilermakers
Bao Nguyen (D)

Labor unions

- Service Employees International Union

Organizations

- Equality California
- Progressive Democrats of America

==== Results ====
California's 46th congressional district election, 2016
Party	Candidate	Votes	%
Democratic	Lou Correa	115,248	70.0
Democratic	Bao Nguyen	49,345	30.0
Total votes		164,593	100.0
Democratic hold			

== District 47 ==
2016 California's 47th congressional district election
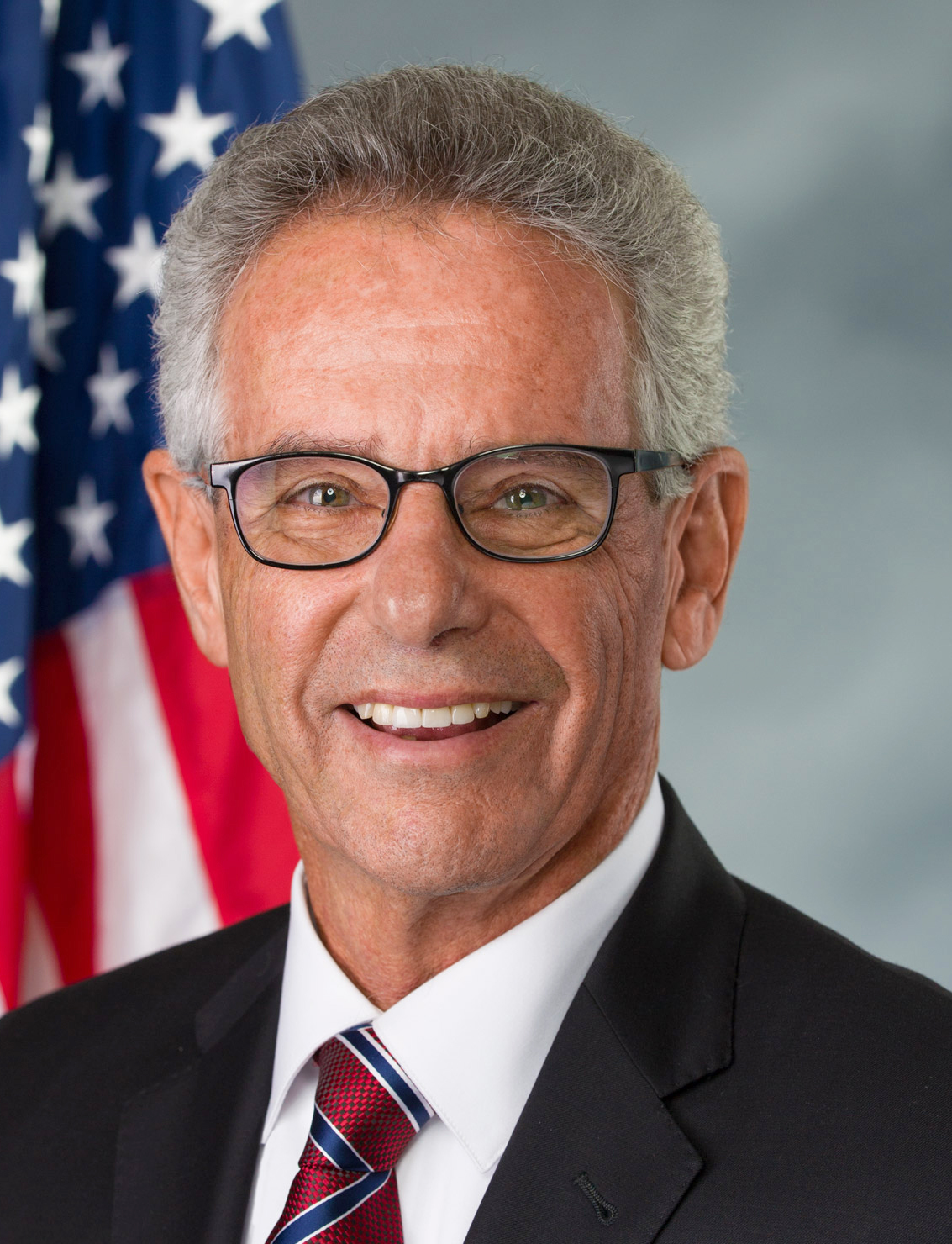

Nominee	Alan Lowenthal	Andy Whallon
Party	Democratic	Republican
Popular vote	154,759	88,109
Percentage	63.7%	36.3%
- County results Lowenthal: 50–60% 60–70%
U.S. Representative before election
Alan Lowenthal
Democratic
Elected U.S. Representative
Alan Lowenthal
Democratic

The 47th district includes Long Beach and parts of Orange County. Incumbent Democrat Alan Lowenthal, who had represented the 47th district since 2013, ran for re-election.

=== Primary election ===
==== Democratic candidates ====
===== Advanced to general =====
- Alan Lowenthal, incumbent U.S. Representative

==== Republican candidates ====
===== Advanced to general =====
- Andy Whallon, engineer and entrepreneur

===== Eliminated in primary =====
- Sanford Kahn, small business owner

==== Endorsements ====
Alan Lowenthal (D)

Labor unions

- AFL-CIO

Organizations

- California Democratic Party

==== Results ====
Nonpartisan blanket primary results
Party	Candidate	Votes	%
Democratic	Alan Lowenthal (incumbent)	90,595	66.1
Republican	Andy Whallon	30,054	21.9
Republican	Sanford W. Kahn	16,364	11.9
No party preference	Rich Camp (write-in)	9	
Total votes		137,022	100.0

=== General election ===
==== Predictions ====
Source	Ranking	As of
The Cook Political Report	Safe D	November 7, 2016
Daily Kos Elections	Safe D	November 7, 2016
Rothenberg	Safe D	November 3, 2016
Sabato's Crystal Ball	Safe D	November 7, 2016
RCP	Safe D	October 31, 2016

==== Endorsements ====
Alan Lowenthal (D)

Labor unions

- AFL-CIO
- Communications Workers of America
- International Brotherhood of Boilermakers

Organizations

- Equality California

==== Results ====
California's 47th congressional district election, 2016
Party	Candidate	Votes	%
Democratic	Alan Lowenthal (incumbent)	154,759	63.7
Republican	Andy Whallon	88,109	36.3
Total votes		242,868	100.0
Democratic hold			

== District 48 ==
2016 California's 48th congressional district election
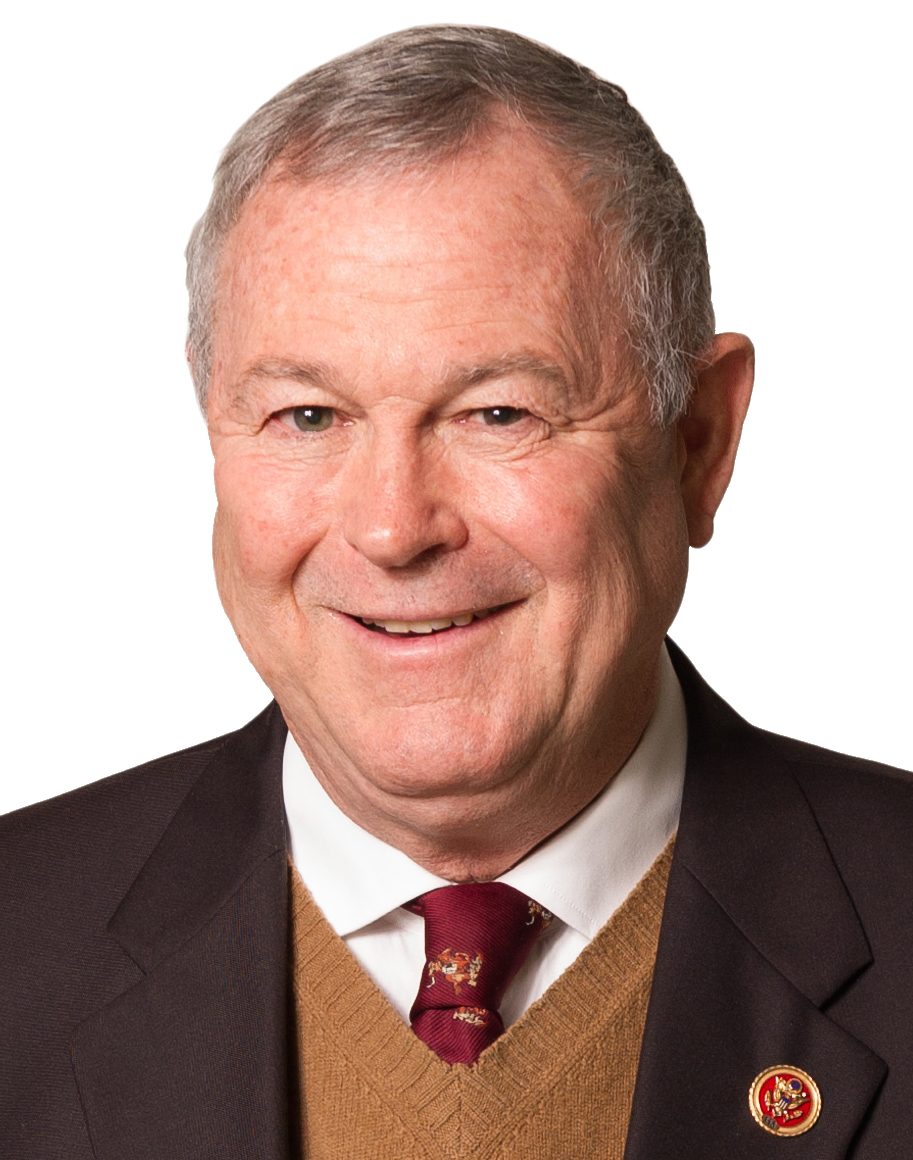

Nominee	Dana Rohrabacher	Suzanne Savary
Party	Republican	Democratic
Popular vote	178,701	127,715
Percentage	58.5%	41.5%
- County results Rohrabacher: 50–60%
U.S. Representative before election
Dana Rohrabacher
Republican
Elected U.S. Representative
Dana Rohrabacher
Republican

The 48th district is based in coastal Orange County and includes Huntington Beach and Newport Beach. Incumbent Republican Dana Rohrabacher, who had represented the 48th district since 2013 and previously represented the 46th district from 2003 to 2013, the 45th district from 1993 to 2003, and the 42nd district from 1989 to 1993, ran for re-election.

=== Primary election ===
==== Republican candidates ====
===== Advanced to general =====
- Dana Rohrabacher, incumbent U.S. Representative

==== Democratic candidates ====
===== Advanced to general =====
- Suzanne Savary, retired business educator

===== Eliminated in primary =====
- Robert John Banuelos, congressional case worker

==== Endorsements ====
Suzanne Savary (D)

Labor unions

- AFL-CIO

Organizations

- California Democratic Party

==== Results ====
Nonpartisan blanket primary results
Party	Candidate	Votes	%
Republican	Dana Rohrabacher (incumbent)	92,815	56.6
Democratic	Suzanne Savary	47,395	28.9
Democratic	Robert John Banuelos	23,867	14.5
Total votes		164,077	100.0

=== General election ===
==== Predictions ====
Source	Ranking	As of
The Cook Political Report	Safe R	November 7, 2016
Daily Kos Elections	Safe R	November 7, 2016
Rothenberg	Safe R	November 3, 2016
Sabato's Crystal Ball	Safe R	November 7, 2016
RCP	Likely R	October 31, 2016

==== Endorsements ====
Dana Rohrabacher (R)

Organizations

- Campaign for Working Families
Suzanne Savary (D)

Labor unions

- AFL-CIO

==== Results ====
California's 48th congressional district election, 2016
Party	Candidate	Votes	%
Republican	Dana Rohrabacher (incumbent)	178,701	58.5
Democratic	Suzanne Savary	127,715	41.5
Total votes		306,416	100.0
Republican hold			

== District 49 ==
2016 California's 49th congressional district election
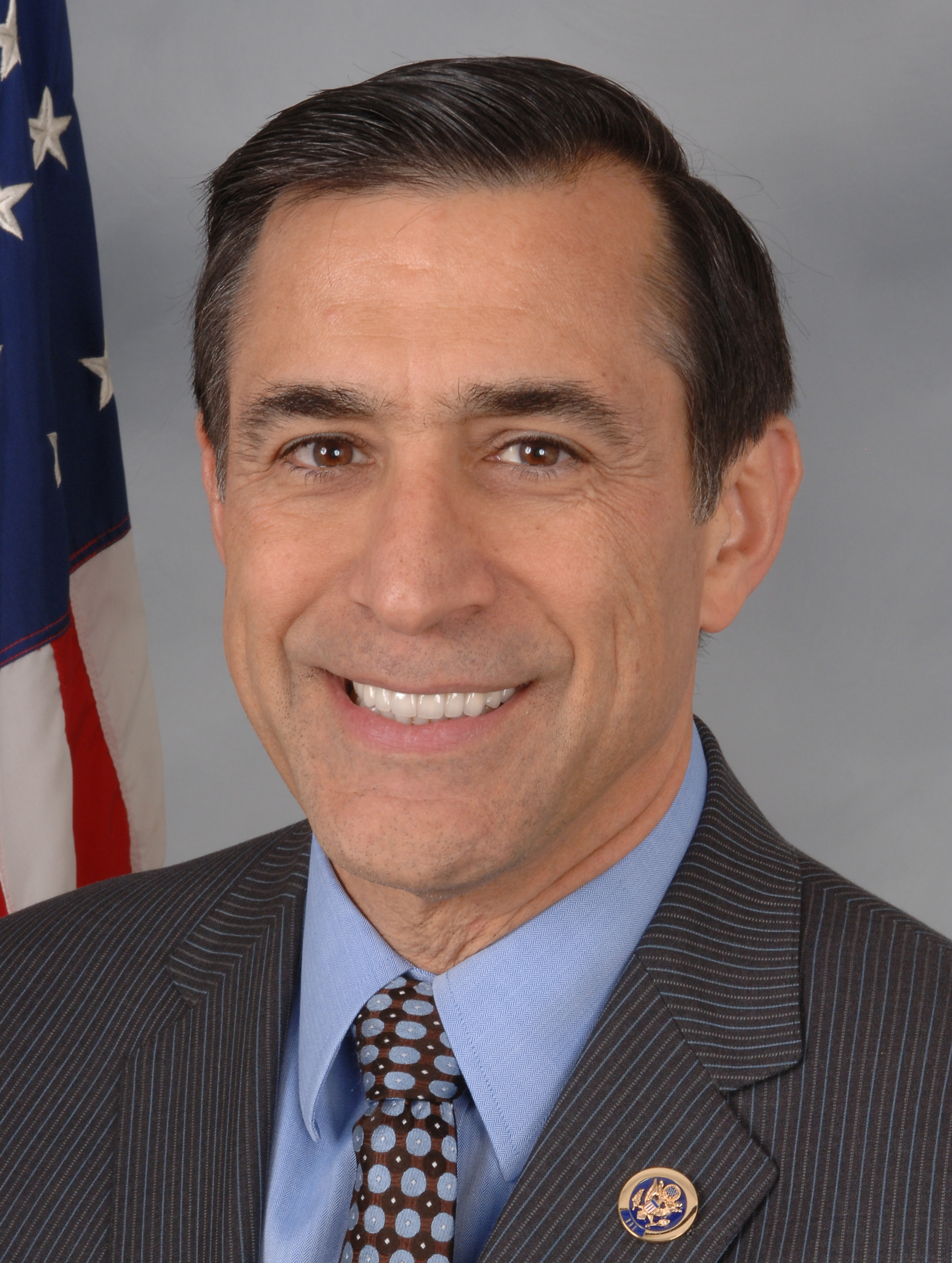

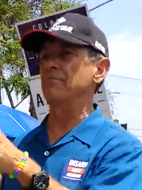
Nominee	Darrell Issa	Doug Applegate
Party	Republican	Democratic
Popular vote	155,888	154,267
Percentage	50.3%	49.7%
- County results Issa: 60–70% Applegate: 50–60%
U.S. Representative before election
Darrell Issa
Republican
Elected U.S. Representative
Darrell Issa
Republican

The 49th district is based in northern San Diego County and parts of southern Orange County. It includes the cities of Carlsbad, Oceanside, and San Clemente. Incumbent Republican Darrell Issa, who had represented the 49th district since 2003 and the 48th district from 2001 to 2003, ran for re-election and won by a margin of 0.52%, making this the closest House race in 2016.

=== Primary election ===
==== Republican candidates ====
===== Advanced to general =====
- Darrell Issa, incumbent U.S. Representative

==== Democratic candidates ====
===== Advanced to general =====
- Doug Applegate, retired Marine Corps colonel and veteran of Operation Iraqi Freedom

==== Independent candidates ====
===== Eliminated in primary =====
- Ryan Glenn Wingo

==== Endorsements ====
Doug Applegate (D)

Labor unions

- AFL-CIO

Organizations

- California Democratic Party

==== Results ====
Nonpartisan blanket primary results
Party	Candidate	Votes	%
Republican	Darrell Issa (incumbent)	84,626	50.8
Democratic	Doug Applegate	75,806	45.5
No party preference	Ryan Glenn Wingo	6,087	3.7
Total votes		166,521	100.0

=== General election ===
==== Endorsements ====
Doug Applegate (D)

Labor unions

- AFL-CIO
- International Brotherhood of Boilermakers
- Service Employees International Union

Organizations

- Democratic Congressional Campaign Committee "Red to Blue" Program
- Equality California
- Progressive Democrats of America
- VoteVets

==== Polling ====
Poll source	Date(s) administered	Sample size	Margin of error	Darrell Issa (R)	Doug Applegate (D)	Undecided
Public Opinion Strategies (R-Issa)	October 4–6, 2016	400	± 4.9%	48%	39%	13%
Tulchin Research (D-DCCC)	September 28–30, 2016	400	± 4.9%	42%	46%	12%
DCCC	September 24–25, 2016	504	± 4.5%	48%	46%	6%
Public Opinion Strategies (R-Issa)	September 6–8, 2016	400	± 4.9%	52%	38%	10%

==== Predictions ====
Source	Ranking	As of
The Cook Political Report	Tossup	November 7, 2016
Daily Kos Elections	Tossup	November 7, 2016
Rothenberg	Tilt R	November 3, 2016
Sabato's Crystal Ball	Lean D (flip)	November 7, 2016
RCP	Tossup	October 31, 2016

==== Results ====
California's 49th congressional district election, 2016
Party	Candidate	Votes	%
Republican	Darrell Issa (incumbent)	155,888	50.3
Democratic	Doug Applegate	154,267	49.7
Total votes		310,155	100.0
Republican hold			

== District 50 ==
2016 California's 50th congressional district election
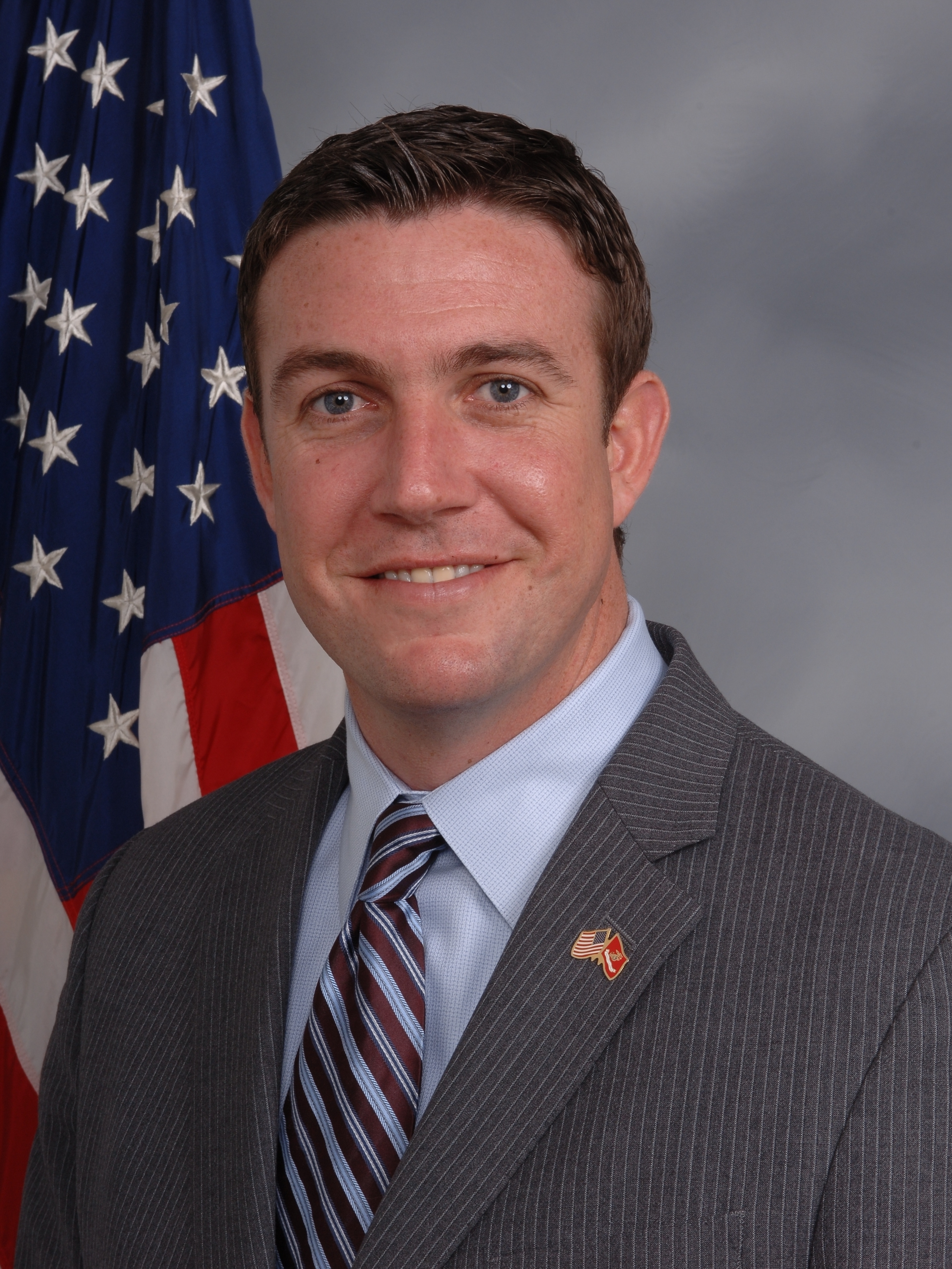

Nominee	Duncan D. Hunter	Patrick Malloy
Party	Republican	Democratic
Popular vote	179,937	103,646
Percentage	63.5%	36.5%
- County results Hunter: 60–70%
U.S. Representative before election
Duncan D. Hunter
Republican
Elected U.S. Representative
Duncan D. Hunter
Republican

The 50th district is based in inland San Diego County and includes Escondido and Santee. Incumbent Republican Duncan D. Hunter, who had represented the 50th district since 2013 and previously represented the 52nd district from 2009 to 2013, ran for re-election.

=== Primary election ===
==== Republican candidates ====
===== Advanced to general =====
- Duncan D. Hunter, incumbent U.S. Representative

===== Eliminated in primary =====
- Scott Meisterlin, businessman

==== Democratic candidates ====
===== Advanced to general =====
- Patrick Malloy, business owner and realtor

===== Eliminated in primary =====
- David Secor

==== Independent candidates ====
===== Eliminated in primary =====
- H. Fuji Shioura, pastor

==== Endorsements ====
Patrick Malloy (D)

Organizations

- California Democratic Party

==== Results ====
Nonpartisan blanket primary results
Party	Candidate	Votes	%
Republican	Duncan D. Hunter (incumbent)	86,534	56.5
Democratic	Patrick Malloy	33,348	21.8
Democratic	David Secor	17,590	11.5
Republican	Scott C. Meisterlin	10,458	6.8
No party preference	H. Fuji Shioura	5,359	3.5
Total votes		153,289	100.0

=== General election ===
==== Predictions ====
Source	Ranking	As of
The Cook Political Report	Safe R	November 7, 2016
Daily Kos Elections	Safe R	November 7, 2016
Rothenberg	Safe R	November 3, 2016
Sabato's Crystal Ball	Safe R	November 7, 2016
RCP	Safe R	October 31, 2016

==== Endorsements ====
Duncan Hunter (R)

Organizations

- Campaign for Working Families
- Eagle Forum
Patrick Malloy (D)

Labor unions

- Service Employees International Union

==== Results ====
California's 50th congressional district election, 2016
Party	Candidate	Votes	%
Republican	Duncan D. Hunter (incumbent)	179,937	63.5
Democratic	Patrick Malloy	103,646	36.5
Total votes		283,583	100.0
Republican hold			

== District 51 ==
2016 California's 51st congressional district election
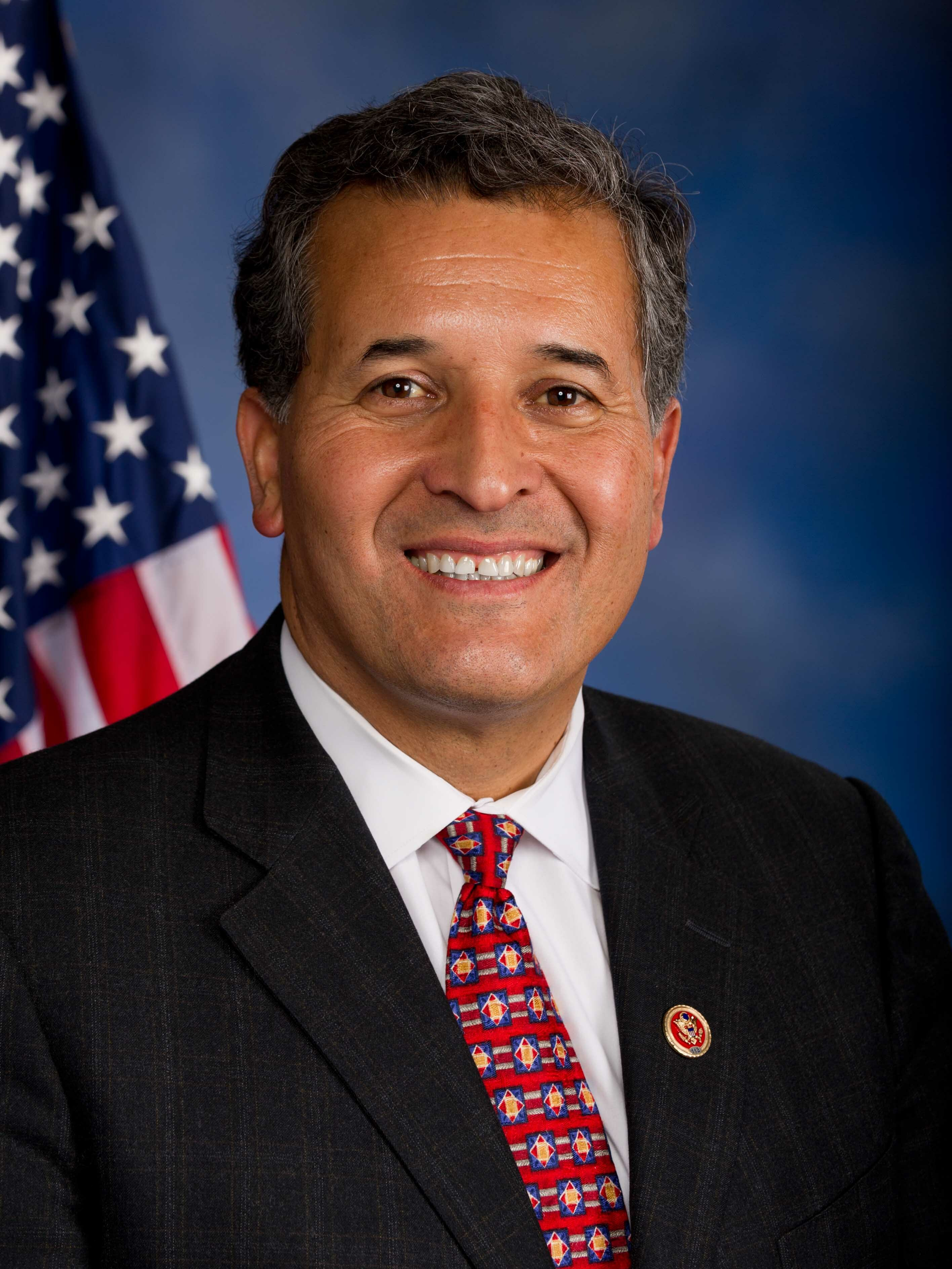

Nominee	Juan Vargas	Juan M. Hidalgo, Jr.
Party	Democratic	Republican
Popular vote	145,162	54,362
Percentage	72.2%	27.8%
- County results Vargas: 60–70% 70–80%
U.S. Representative before election
Juan Vargas
Democratic
Elected U.S. Representative
Juan Vargas
Democratic

The new 51st district runs along the border with Mexico and includes Imperial County and San Diego. Incumbent Democrat Juan Vargas, who had represented the 51st district since 2013, ran for re-election.

=== Primary election ===
==== Democratic candidates ====
===== Advanced to general =====
- Juan Vargas, incumbent U.S. Representative

===== Eliminated in primary =====
- Juan Mercado-Flores, deputy sheriff

==== Republican candidates ====
===== Advanced to general =====
- Juan M. Hidalgo Jr., retired U.S. Marine

===== Eliminated in primary =====
- Carlos J. Sanchez, pediatrician

==== Endorsements ====
Juan Vargas (D)

Labor unions

- AFL-CIO

Organizations

- California Democratic Party

==== Results ====
Nonpartisan blanket primary results
Party	Candidate	Votes	%
Democratic	Juan Vargas (incumbent)	69,522	66.8
Republican	Juan M. Hidalgo, Jr.	16,053	15.4
Democratic	Juan "Charly" Mercado-Flores	9,781	9.4
Republican	Carlos J. Sanchez	8,681	8.3
Total votes		104,037	100.0

=== General election ===
==== Predictions ====
Source	Ranking	As of
The Cook Political Report	Safe D	November 7, 2016
Daily Kos Elections	Safe D	November 7, 2016
Rothenberg	Safe D	November 3, 2016
Sabato's Crystal Ball	Safe D	November 7, 2016
RCP	Safe D	October 31, 2016

==== Endorsements ====
Juan Vargas (D)

Labor unions

- AFL-CIO
- Communications Workers of America
- International Brotherhood of Boilermakers

Organizations

- Equality California

==== Results ====
California's 51st congressional district election, 2016
Party	Candidate	Votes	%
Democratic	Juan Vargas (incumbent)	145,162	72.2
Republican	Juan M. Hidalgo, Jr.	54,362	27.8
Total votes		199,524	100.0
Democratic hold			

== District 52 ==
2016 California's 52nd congressional district election
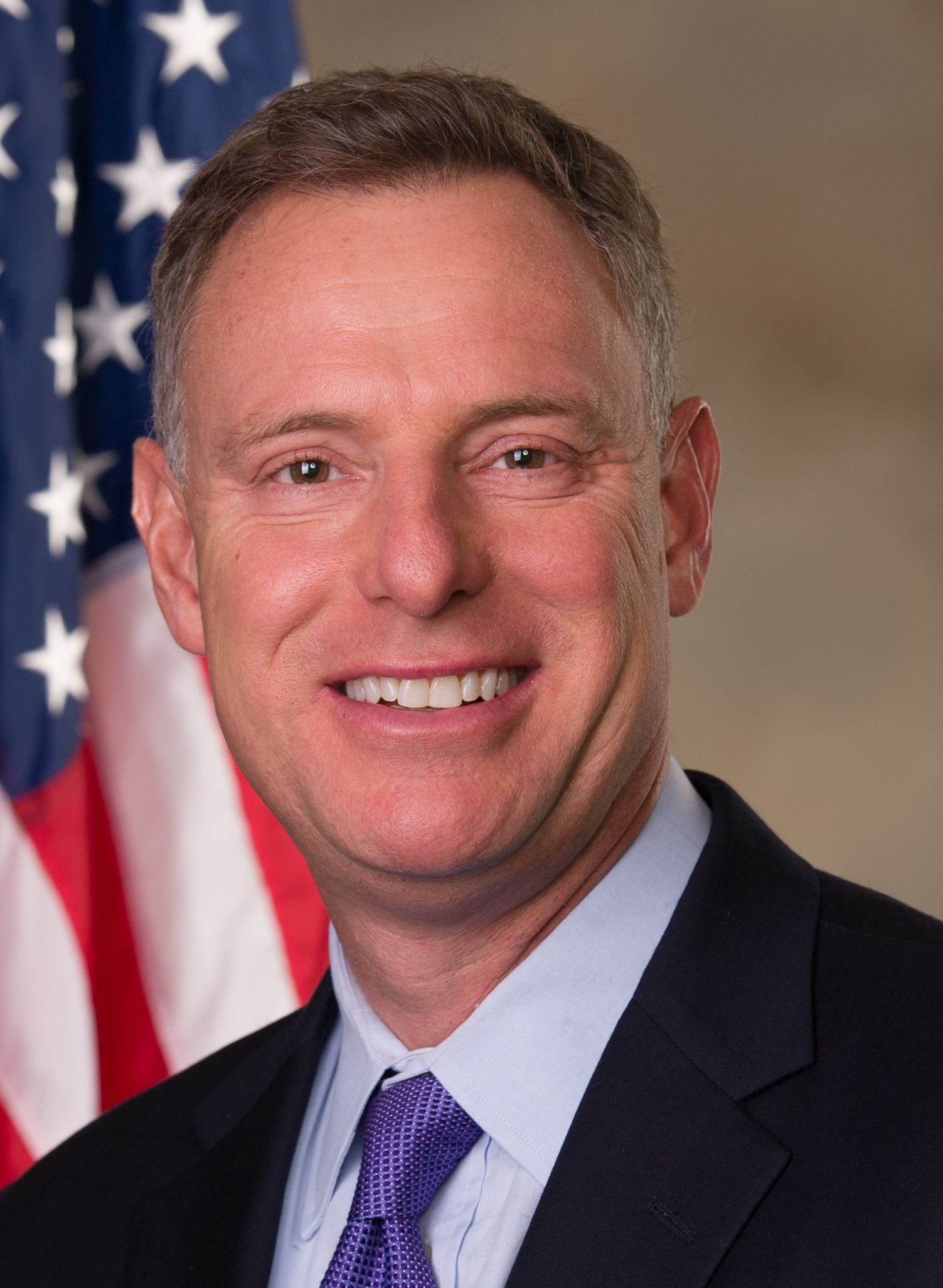

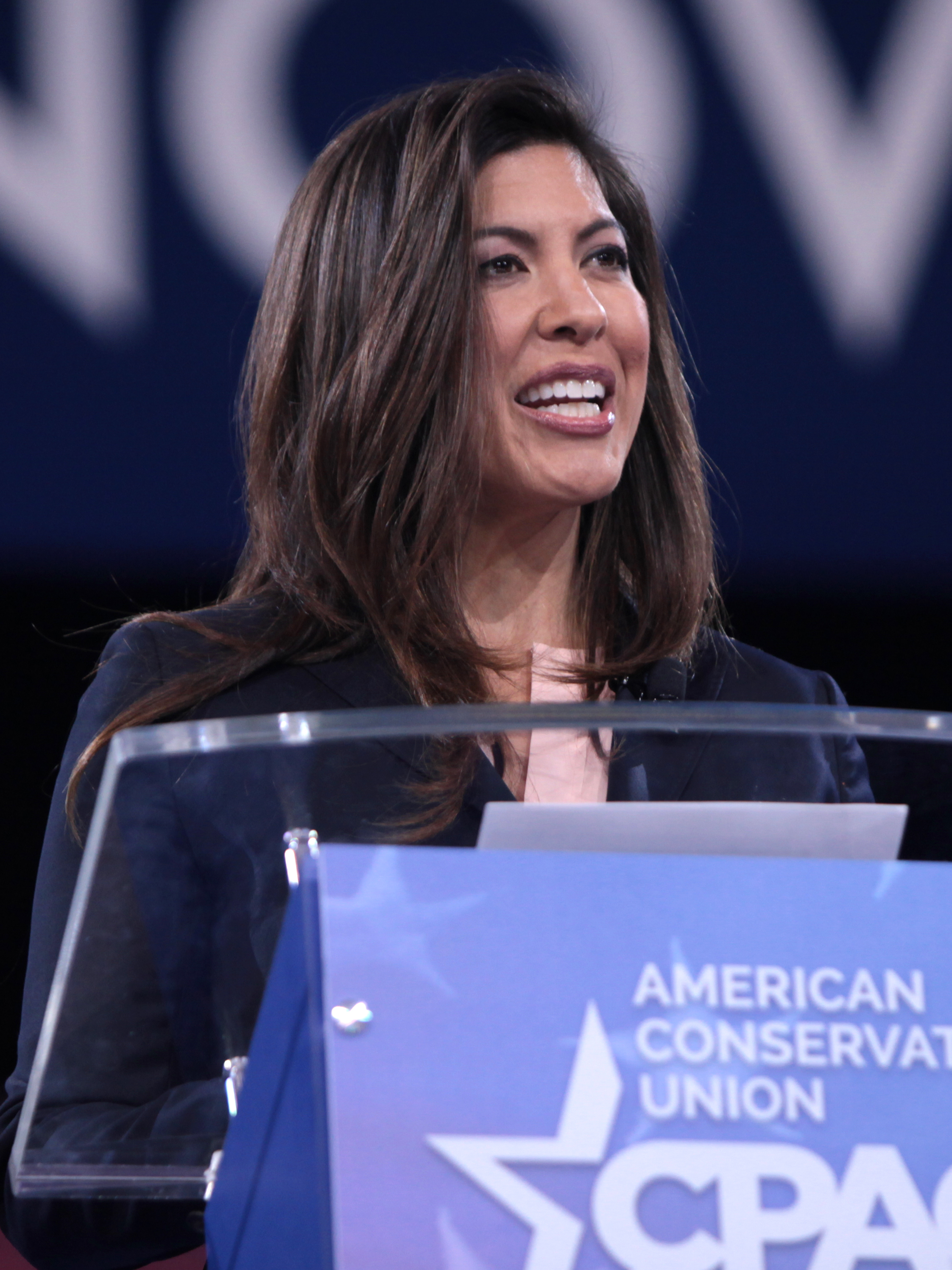
Nominee	Scott Peters	Denise Gitsham
Party	Democratic	Republican
Popular vote	181,253	139,403
Percentage	56.5%	43.5%
- County results Peters: 50–60%
U.S. Representative before election
Scott Peters
Democratic
Elected U.S. Representative
Scott Peters
Democratic

The 52nd district is based in coastal San Diego and includes La Jolla and Poway. Incumbent Democrat Scott Peters, who had represented the 52nd district since 2013, ran for re-election.

=== Primary election ===
==== Democratic candidates ====
===== Advanced to general =====
- Scott Peters, incumbent U.S. Representative

==== Republican candidates ====
===== Advanced to general =====
- Denise Gitsham, attorney and former George W. Bush aide

===== Eliminated in primary =====
- Terry Reagan Allvord, small business owner
- Jacquie Atkinson, Marine Corps veteran
- Kenneth Canada, university professor
- John Horst, planning group leader

==== Endorsements ====
Scott Peters (D)

Organizations

- California Democratic Party

==== Results ====
Nonpartisan blanket primary results
Party	Candidate	Votes	%
Democratic	Scott Peters (incumbent)	108,020	58.9
Republican	Denise Gitsham	29,658	18.2
Republican	Jacquie Atkinson	23,927	13.0
Republican	Kenneth "Mike" Canada	8,268	4.5
Republican	Terry Reagan Allvord	8,194	4.5
Republican	John Horst	5,435	3.0
Total votes		183,502	100.0

=== General election ===
==== Endorsements ====
Scott Peters (D)

Organizations

- Democratic Congressional Campaign Committee "Frontline" Program
- End Citizens United
- Equality California
- United States Chamber of Commerce
Denise Gitsham (R)

Organizations

- BIPAC
- National Republican Congressional Committee "Young Guns" Program

==== Predictions ====
Source	Ranking	As of
The Cook Political Report	Safe D	November 7, 2016
Daily Kos Elections	Safe D	November 7, 2016
Rothenberg	Safe D	November 3, 2016
Sabato's Crystal Ball	Safe D	November 7, 2016
RCP	Likely D	October 31, 2016

==== Results ====
California's 52nd congressional district election, 2016
Party	Candidate	Votes	%
Democratic	Scott Peters (incumbent)	181,253	56.5
Republican	Denise Gitsham	139,403	43.5
Total votes		320,656	100.0
Democratic hold			

== District 53 ==
2016 California's 53rd congressional district election
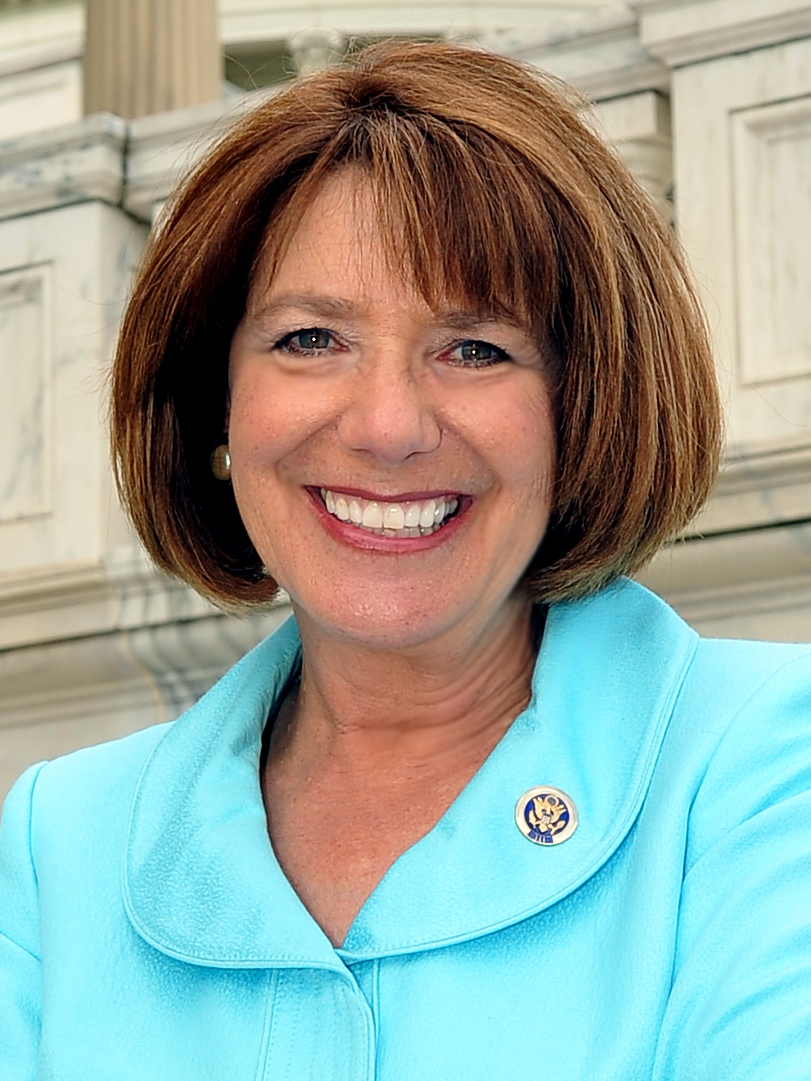

Nominee	Susan Davis	James Veltmeyer
Party	Democratic	Republican
Popular vote	198,988	97,968
Percentage	67.0%	33.0%
- County results Davis: 60–70%
U.S. Representative before election
Susan Davis
Democratic
Elected U.S. Representative
Susan Davis
Democratic

The 53rd district is based in Central San Diego and includes La Mesa and Lemon Grove. Incumbent Democrat Susan Davis, who had represented the 53rd district since 2003 and previously represented the 49th district from 2001 to 2003, ran for re-election.

=== Primary election ===
==== Democratic candidates ====
===== Advanced to general =====
- Susan Davis, incumbent U.S. Representative

===== Eliminated in primary =====
- Nicholas Walpert, business executive

==== Republican candidates ====
===== Advanced to general =====
- James Veltmeyer, physician

===== Eliminated in primary =====
- Jim Ash, small business owner

==== Endorsements ====
Susan Davis (D)

Organizations

- California Democratic Party

==== Results ====
Nonpartisan blanket primary results
Party	Candidate	Votes	%
Democratic	Susan Davis (incumbent)	110,831	65.5
Republican	James Veltmeyer	25,656	15.2
Republican	Jim Ash	25,410	15.0
Democratic	Nicholas "Nick" Walpert	7,363	4.4
Total votes		169,260	100.0

=== General election ===
==== Predictions ====
Source	Ranking	As of
The Cook Political Report	Safe D	November 7, 2016
Daily Kos Elections	Safe D	November 7, 2016
Rothenberg	Safe D	November 3, 2016
Sabato's Crystal Ball	Safe D	November 7, 2016
RCP	Safe D	October 31, 2016

==== Endorsements ====
Susan Davis (D)

Organizations

- Equality California

==== Results ====
California's 53rd congressional district election, 2016
Party	Candidate	Votes	%
Democratic	Susan Davis (incumbent)	198,988	67.0
Republican	James Veltmeyer	97,968	33.0
Total votes		296,956	100.0
Democratic hold			

== See also ==
- United States House of Representatives elections, 2016
- United States elections, 2016
