= Party Girl (1995 film) =

1995 film by Daisy von Scherler Mayer

- Theatrical release poster
- Directed by: Daisy von Scherler Mayer
- Screenplay by: Harry Birckmayer; Daisy von Scherler Mayer
- Story by: Harry Birckmayer; Daisy von Scherler Mayer; Sheila Gaffney
- Produced by: Harry Birckmayer; Stephanie Koules
- Starring: Parker Posey; Anthony DeSando; Guillermo Díaz; Donna Mitchell; Liev Schreiber; Omar Townsend; Sasha von Scherler
- Cinematography: Michael Slovis
- Edited by: Cara Silverman
- Music by: Anton Sanko
- Production company: Party Pictures
- Distributed by: First Look Pictures
- Release dates: January 1995 (Sundance); June 3, 1995 (Internet broadcast for SIFF); June 9, 1995 (US wide release)
- Running time: 94 minutes
- Country: United States
- Language: English
- Budget: $150,000
- Box office: $472,370

Party Girl is a 1995 American independent comedy-drama film starring Parker Posey and directed by Daisy von Scherler Mayer. It was the first feature film to premiere on the Internet.

== Plot ==
Mary is a free-spirited young woman living in New York City who fills her days by going to nightclubs and house parties. When she is arrested for organizing an underground rave, she gets her godmother Judy to pay her bail. To repay Judy, Mary agrees to work as a clerk at a branch of the New York Public Library that Judy manages.

Despite her initial misgivings, Mary is inspired to learn how to use the Dewey Decimal System after smoking a joint and strikes up a romance with Mustafa, a Lebanese street vendor and aspiring teacher.

Gradually, she becomes highly adept at her job; however, she is later fired after having sex with Mustafa in the library and irresponsibly leaving a window open, allowing rain to damage some nearly irreplaceable books. With no money to pay the accumulating rent, she and her roommate, club DJ Leo, face eviction from their apartment. In desperation, Mary sells her vintage couture to pay the bills.

During one of her parties, Mary takes drugs to forget a fight with Mustafa. The next day, she decides to seriously commit to being a librarian and investigates getting a graduate degree in library science.

She invites Judy over for a serious talk but then Mary is dismayed to discover a raucous surprise birthday party complete with a male stripper.

Mary tells a skeptical Judy that she has finally found her calling in life. Leo and Mustafa each share how Mary used her library science skills to help them improve their careers. Impressed, Judy gives Mary her job back.

== Cast ==
- Parker Posey as Mary
- Anthony DeSando as Derrick
- Guillermo Díaz as Leo
- Donna Mitchell as Rene
- Liev Schreiber as Nigel
- Omar Townsend as Mustafa
- Sasha von Scherler as Judy Lindendorf
- Becky Mode as Ann
- Simon Verhoeven as Kurt
- Nicole Bobbitt as Venus
- Richard Topol as Hannah Arendt Buff
- John Ventimiglia as tough guy in line

== Production ==
The film had a budget of $150,000 and was shot in 19 days. Much of the cast and crew were already immersed in the queer downtown club scene long before the film was made. In an interview with The Wall Street Journal, Posey recalls that in the early 1990s she "would go out rollerblading at The Roxy on Sundays and to [the party] Love Machine, where I first saw RuPaul", and that, much like in Party Girl's club scenes, Posey "would dance with the queens, and they would just annihilate me on the dance floor with their moves."

According to director Daisy von Scherler Meyer, "the fashion was really invented for the film. [Michael Clancy] created an aesthetic for the character and for the movie and combined that with Parker Posey's own fashion obsession." Posey says that they relied on favors to assemble the outfits: "The wardrobe designer, Michael Clancy, and his assistant Vicky Farrell ... pulled a lot of things from their friends", such as designer Todd Oldham.

== Internet broadcast ==
Party Girl had an Internet premiere ahead of its wide release, transmitted from the office of Glenn Fleishman and his Point of Presence Company on June 3, 1995. While the early video transmission was limited to black and white, it marked the first time a feature film with an American movie theater release was broadcast generally online. Appearing live in the PoPCo offices, Posey welcomed Internet viewers and then introduced the film.

Fleishman recalled the event:

I helped launch the first official full-length [Internet] movie premiere in 1995 in my offices in Seattle. The film was broadcast to several hundred people worldwide over a CU-SeeMe reflector at Point of Presence Company's offices in downtown and then [in] a few minutes, it was projected at The Egyptian in Seattle's Capitol Hill neighborhood. Parker Posey was in our offices to hit the start button on the broadcast. I was one cog in a larger set of wheels that involved the Seattle International Film Festival, Film.com (now part of RealNetworks), First Look Releasing, and the film's producers, as well as another online development company and a CUSeeMe engineering consultant, Joseph Kahan who also worked at NASA down in Texas. The launch was shown on NBC Nightly News in a five-minute segment at the bottom of the Sunday broadcast that week.

== Music ==
With much of the action driven by clubs, party scenes, and a DJ character, most of the film's music is diegetic, with characters often engaging with music appropriate to the mid-1990s club scene. Bill Coleman served as the film's Music Supervisor.

Track	Written by	Performed by	Scene in film
"Mama Told Me Not to Come"	Randy Newman	The Wolfgang Press	Opening party
"Beautiful"	C. Frantz T. Weymouth	Tom Tom Club	Mary, Leo, and Derrick getting ready to go to Rene's
"Les Ailes"	Hadj Brahim Khaled	Khaled	Mustafa's Falafel Stand
"Let's Go"	Joseph Longo	Pal Joey	Outside Rene's with Mary, Leo, Nigel, and Derrick
"Aase Hechchagide (Desire Soars Up High"	S.P. Balasubrahmanyam, Vani Jairam	S.P. Balasubrahmanyarn & Vani Jairarn	Mary's Mustafa fantasy dance
"The Boom"	Eric Hilton	Peace Bureau	The "Imitate a Cat Puking" scene
"What You About? (Vocal Version)"	The Angel	The Angel featuring Cokni O'Dire	Outside Rene's with Mustafa and Nigel
"Puerto Rico"	Frankie Cutlass	Frankie Cutlass Show	Mary walking out of the library after she yells at the patron who put the book back incorrectly
"In The Dark We Live (Thee Lite)" (Dave Clarke's 312 Mix)	Felix Stallings	Aphrohead, AKA Felix Da Housecat	The song just before Leo puts on Teddy Rogers
"To Be Loved"	Heiner Zwahlen, Elisa Burchett	Basscut	When Leo flirts with Venus
"You Don't Love Me (No, No, No)"	Dawn Penn	Dawn Penn	After Beautiful is done playing
"U Got Me Up"	Cajmere, Dajae	Dajae	The Natasha scene inside Rene's club
"Big Apple Boogaloo"	Arthur Baker, Lati Kronlund	Brooklyn Funk Essentials	Derrick and Mary stealing clothes
"My Adidas / Peter Piper"	Darryl McDaniels, Joseph Simmons	Run-DMC	Leo and Mustafa
"Anyone Could Happen to Me"	A Baker, A. Kroell, C. Reeves	Nation of Abel	During Leo's first night working as a DJ at Rene's club
"If You Believe (Believer Mix)"	Chantay Savage, Eric Miller, Michael Dawson	Chantay Savage	Leo's first night working as a DJ at Rene's club, intercut with Mary's drunken adventure learning the Dewey Decimal System at the library
"Lick It! (No Afro Sheen Mix House of Love More Phearce)"	Karen Finley	Karen Finley	The song supposedly produced by the fictional Teddy Rogers, when Rene screams at Leo to turn it off
"Mustafa's Theme"	Peter Daou, Vanessa Daou	The Daou	Unknown (possibly Mustafa and Mary in the library)
"House Of Love (In My House)"	Erick Morillo, Kenny Lewis	Smooth Touch	Mary's Arabic-style party
"Keep It Up!"	Lutz Ludwig, Klaus Jankuhn	L.U.P.O.	Final scene while the stripper is dancing
"Throw"	Carl Craig	Carl Craig Presents Paper Clip People	Mary's Arabic-style party (mixed with Les Ailes)
'Music Selector Is the Soul Reflector"	Dmitry Brill	Deee-Lite	Mary's Drunken Dance
"Never Take Your Place"	Larry Heard	Mr. Fingers	Leo and Derrick setting up Mary's party
"I'll Keep Coming Back"	Charlene Munford, Al Mack, Terry Jeffries	Chanelle	Mary harassing Mustafa
"Hopefully Yours"	Stina Nordenstam	Stina Nordenstam	Leo and Mary in the shower
"Carnival '93 (Mardi Gras Mix)"	G. Pizaro, R. Morillo	Club Ultimate	Mary's surprise party
"Party Girl (Turn Me Loose)"	U. Nate, A. Mack	Ultra Naté	End Credits

=== Soundtrack album ===
Selected tracks were compiled for the Party Girl soundtrack released June 8, 1995 by Relativity Records. Bill Coleman was the soundtrack's Executive Producer and A&R.

1. "Mama Told Me (Not to Come)" – The Wolfgang Press
2. "Beautiful" – Tom Tom Club
3. "You Don't Love Me (No, No, No)" – Dawn Penn
4. "Les Ailes" – Khaled
5. "I'll Keep Coming Back" – Chanelle
6. "Big Apple Boogaloo" – Brooklyn Funk Essentials
7. "Anyone Could Happen to Me" – Nation of Abel
8. "Peter Piper" – Run–D.M.C.
9. "To Be Loved" – Basscut
10. "Never Take Your Place" – Mr. Fingers
11. "Music Selector Is the Soul Reflector" – Deee-Lite
12. "Party Girl (Turn Me Loose)" – Ultra Naté

== Reception ==
The film opened on June 9, 1995, and grossed $472,370 during its initial theatrical release, and has since become a cult classic. Posey says she often gets approached by librarians who are fans of the film: "Librarians and people who work in bookstores are like 'Oh my God, thank you so much. Party Girl made me want to become a librarian.'" Von Scherler Meyer believes Party Girl resonates with audiences because of the film's authentic depiction of underrepresented communities: "When people say 'Oh, the world [in Party Girl] is so diverse,' it's like 'No. That's the world. You don't represent the world in your stuff. Why is your world so segregated?' I think the world is messed up, and Party Girl is normal." On the review aggregator website Rotten Tomatoes, the film holds an approval rating of 82% based on 39 critic reviews, with an average rating of 6.3/10. Metacritic, which uses a weighted average, assigned the film a score of 55 out of 100, based on 16 critics, indicating "mixed or average" reviews.

The film often is noted for its influence on fashion, particularly in the case of Mary's wardrobe.

== Television spin-off ==
A television series based on the film was produced in 1996, starring Christine Taylor as Mary and Swoosie Kurtz as Judy. Although six episodes were filmed, only four were aired and the show was quickly cancelled.

== Home video ==
The 2023 Blu-ray release includes audio commentary by radio personality Jake Fogelnest.
