= Marianne Williamson 2024 presidential campaign =

American political campaign

Marianne Williamson for President
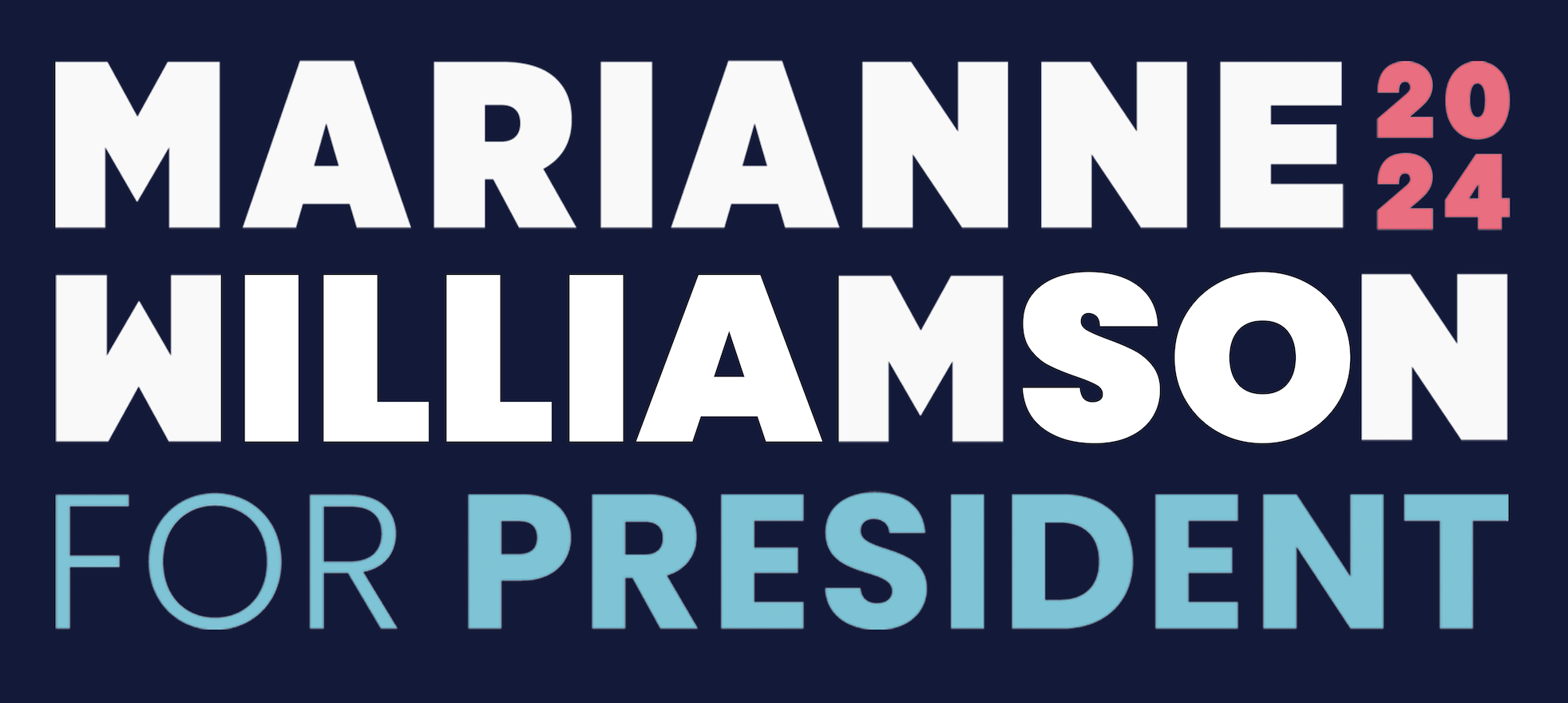
- Campaign: 2024 U.S. presidential election (Democratic Party primaries)
- Candidate: Marianne Williamson
- Announced: March 4, 2023; February 28, 2024; July 2, 2024
- Suspended: February 7, 2024; June 11, 2024; July 29, 2024
- Headquarters: Washington, D.C.
- Key people: Carlos Cardona (former campaign manager); Peter Daou (former campaign manager); Harvey J. Kaye (campaign advisor); Robin Vogt (national volunteer coordinator)
- Receipts: US$5,136,128.43 (April 30, 2024)
- Slogan(s): A New Beginning; Disrupt the System; Dedicated to the People

Website
- Official website

Marianne Williamson, an author, political activist, and candidate for the Democratic Party presidential nomination in 2020, announced her campaign for the 2024 United States presidential election on March 4, 2023. Williamson was the first major Democratic candidate to officially announce their candidacy, as President Joe Biden did not announce his re-election bid until April 2023. Williamson suspended her campaign on February 7, 2024, as a result of her losses in the New Hampshire, South Carolina and Nevada Democratic primaries. She later retracted her campaign suspension and officially rejoined the race on February 28, 2024, following her third place finish in the Michigan Democratic primary ahead of Dean Phillips, whose campaign was still active at the time. On June 11, 2024, Williamson announced her decision to suspend her campaign again. On July 2, 2024, Williamson again announced her decision to resume her campaign following calls for Biden to drop out after his performance at the June 27 presidential debate. On July 29, 2024, Williamson announced she did not file a run against Harris in the planned virtual roll call vote, ending her campaign.

== Background ==
Williamson first ran for office in the 2014 U.S. House elections, seeking to represent California's 33rd congressional district as an independent. She placed third in the nonpartisan blanket primary and did not advance to the general election. She later ran a campaign for the 2020 Democratic Party presidential nomination. She formally ended her campaign on January 10, 2020, endorsing Bernie Sanders and then Joe Biden as the nominee.

== Campaign ==
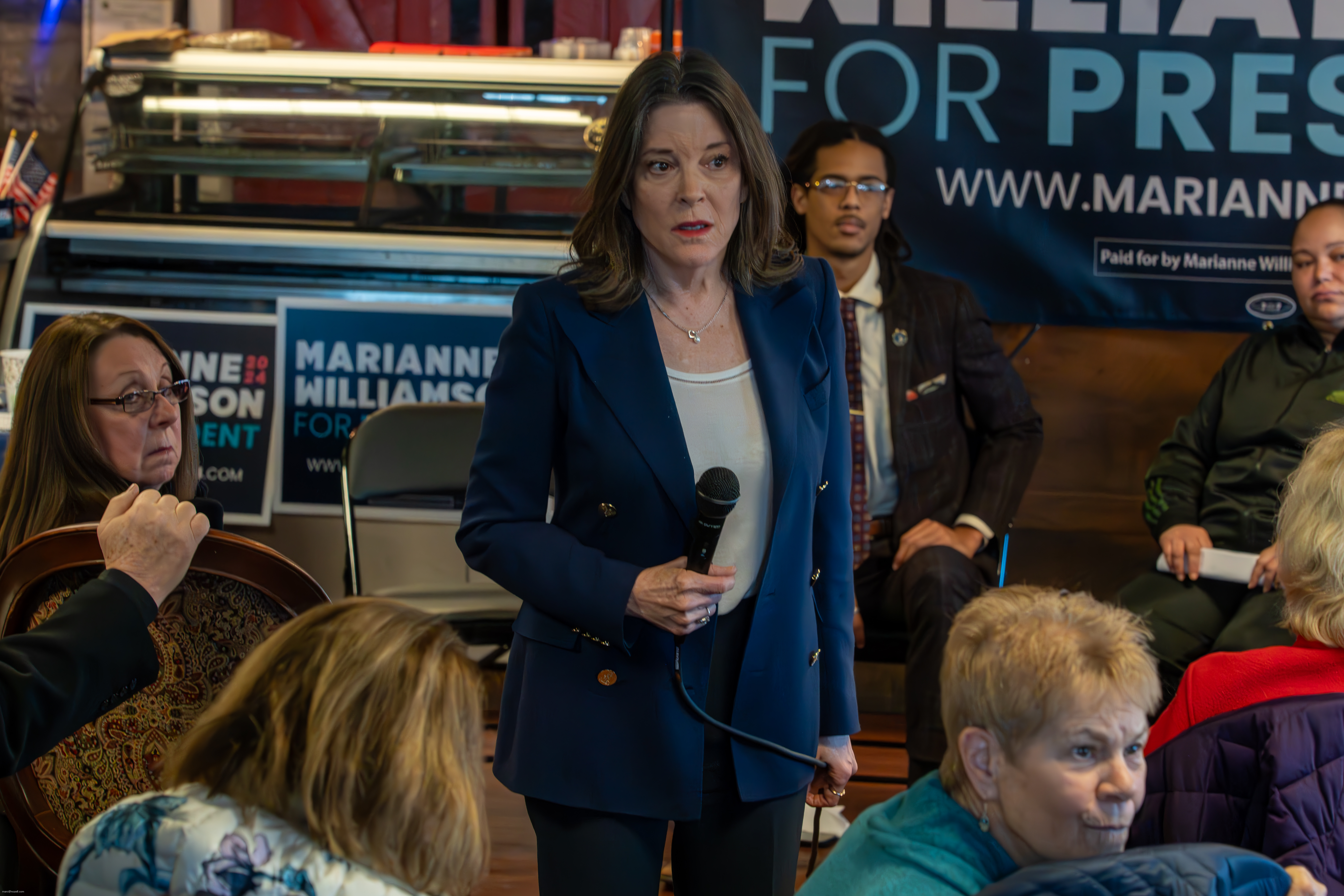
Williamson speaking at a campaign event in Nashua, New Hampshire.

=== Announcement and launch ===
On February 18, 2023, Williamson confirmed she would make "an important announcement" in Washington, D.C., on March 4 regarding the 2024 presidential election. In an interview with Politico published the day before she teased the announcement, she said if she were to run, she would remain with the Democratic Party, in an apparent move to set up a primary challenge against incumbent President Joe Biden; she stated a factor into her decision would be to address what she described as Biden's "message that the economy is getting stronger".

Williamson formally announced her candidacy in a twenty-minute speech she delivered at Union Station. Facing steep competition in the primary against an incumbent, several journalists and commentators have deemed her campaign a "long shot". Some Williamson supporters have criticized the media for focusing on their view of her as a long shot candidate, rather than on the substance of her platform.

In late November 2023, Williamson and fellow Biden challengers, Dean Phillips and Cenk Uygur, claimed they were unfairly disqualified from getting on the Florida Democratic Party primary ballot, which the party discounted. The following week, the underdog trio arranged to appear together and respond to the Republican candidates' December 6 debate and discuss their policy positions on Uygur's The Young Turks (TYT) network.

=== Staff relations ===
Williamson's campaign has had trouble with maintaining relations with her staff. In March 2023, Politico published a report detailing Williamson's alleged abuses towards her staffers on her 2020 campaign. The staffers, who remained anonymous due to having signed non-disclosure agreements (NDAs), described a toxic work environment. One reported it as, "It would be foaming, spitting, uncontrollable rage." "It was traumatic. And the experience, in the end, was terrifying." In contrast to her career message of love, she threw phones, some said, and shouted at them so intensely they were reduced to tears. Her anger over logistics in South Carolina had led her to strike a vehicle repeatedly, to the extent that her hand swelled so much she had to be transported for medical attention. Williamson has called the article a "distraction" and a "hit piece," but acknowledged she had room for personal growth.

On May 20, 2023, Williamson's campaign manager Peter Daou announced via Twitter he was leaving the Williamson campaign, citing a need to care for his and his wife's ailing parents, and stating that he still "believe[s] deeply in the campaign’s platform." Additionally, her deputy campaign manager Jason Call told Politico that he had resigned the day before, but refused to provide any more details. In September 2023, Daou became the campaign manager for Cornel West's 2024 presidential run under the Green Party ticket.

In June 2023, Williamson's second campaign manager, Roza Calderon, left the campaign, with a friend contending that Calderon had "tried to right the ship and lead this campaign. Marianne knocked her down every chance she got."

In early July 2023, six more staff members left the Williamson campaign in a mix of firings and resignations, which included her entire South Carolina team. Reportedly, several staff members had been disappointed with Williamson about her lack of ballot access operations. Williamson announced a new book scheduled to come out in September 2023, which led one of the former staffers to call her campaign a "grift" for media attention to promote her new book.

In January 2024, her third campaign manager, Carlos Cardona, resigned.

=== Primaries ===
Williamson placed third in the 2024 New Hampshire Democratic primary with about 4 percent of the vote. Following the primary, she held an online meeting with campaign volunteers to discuss her next steps. A recording of the call was later circulated on social media, although Williamson continued her campaign.

She received 2.1% of the vote, and zero delegates, in the 2024 South Carolina Democratic presidential primary on February 3, 2024, which was the first state to earn delegates for Democratic candidates, as the New Hampshire primary was unsanctioned. Williamson was on the ballot for the 2024 Nevada Democratic presidential primary on February 6, 2024, and received 3% of the vote causing her not win any delegates. In the 2024 Kansas Democratic presidential primary, Greeley County experienced a tie between Biden, "None of these names", and Williamson.

=== Suspensions and unsuspensions ===
Williamson suspended her campaign on February 7, 2024, following her losses in the New Hampshire, South Carolina, and Nevada primaries, winning 5,016 votes (4.0%) in New Hampshire, 2,786 votes (2.1%) in South Carolina, and 3,909 votes (3.0%) in Nevada.

Williamson announced on February 28, 2024, that she was "unsuspending" her presidential campaign following the over 100,000 votes for "Uncommitted" in the Michigan Democratic primary.

On Super Tuesday, Williamson received about 200,000 of the more than six million votes cast. She was largely shut out of delegates, as she failed to break 15% of the vote in any states. Her best finishes were in Oklahoma, where she received 9.1% of the vote, and Virginia, where she received 7.8% of the vote.

Williamson announced on June 11 that she would leave the race.

On July 2, Williamson reentered the race following criticism of Biden in the aftermath of his debate with Donald Trump. Following Biden's suspension of his campaign and subsequent endorsement of Kamala Harris on July 21, Williamson continued calls for an open convention, arguing that the vice president should not be "anointed to the position of nominee."

She withdrew over a week later, on July 29, announcing that she did not file a run against Harris in the planned virtual roll call vote, ending her campaign.

== Political positions ==
Described as a progressive Democrat, Williamson's policies are similar to those of her former 2020 rival Bernie Sanders, whom she initially endorsed after exiting that race. Sanders has likewise expressed praise for Williamson, although he has endorsed Biden in the 2024 race. According to ABC News, her priorities include free healthcare, free college, and free childcare. Williamson promotes progressive and social democratic policies in the spirit of President Franklin Roosevelt's New Deal, such as a 21st Century Economic Bill of Rights promoted by her friend, campaign advisor and FDR historian, Harvey J. Kaye and Alan Minsky of the Progressive Democrats of America (PDA).

Williamson has called for creating a Department of Peace, which would promote peace and diplomacy, as well as a Department of Children and Youth, which Williamson says are severely neglected and calls the current treatment of children by the government "collective neglection". She believes the United States needs mass-mobilization in order to prevent a climate catastrophe. She also supports certain proposed constitutional amendments, such as the Equal Rights Amendment and a proposed amendment to enshrine rights for individuals who identify as LGBTQ+.

Williamson expressed support for universal-basic-income during her 2020 and 2024 presidential runs.

== Polling ==
In opinion polling, Williamson typically averaged around the high single digits in national polls. The highest poll number recorded was 13% which she received in a November Fox News poll.

== Endorsements ==
Some early supporters of Williamson include actor Keith David, as well as political commentators Krystal Ball and Kyle Kulinski.
