= Vanessa Daou =

American singer, poet, & dancer (1967-)

- Born: Vanessa Dale; October 4, 1967 (age 59); St. Thomas, U.S. Virgin Islands
- Genres: Electronic; trip hop; spoken word; nu jazz
- Occupations: Singer; songwriter; poet; visual artist; dancer
- Years active: 1990–present
- Labels: Columbia Records; Tribal Records; Lotus Records; MCA; DaouMusic; Oxygen Music Works; EMI France
- Spouse: Peter Daou (divorced)
- Website: vanessadaou.com

Vanessa Dale Daou (born October 4, 1967) is an American singer, songwriter, poet, visual artist and dancer. Most notably a musician, her work is known among nu jazz, trip hop and electronic music circles for her trademark spoken word and aspirated singing style as well as its erotic and literary subtexts. Daou's songs are represented by Downtown Music Publishing.

== Early life ==
Daou was born and spent her early childhood in St. Thomas, U.S. Virgin Islands, relocating in 1984 to attend boarding school in Massachusetts. As a young adult, she attended Vassar College for two years and spent several years in New York City's Hell's Kitchen area before earning a scholarship to study dance at Columbia University. There, she would train with choreographer Eric Hawkins and explore visual art with Barry Moser and poetry with Kenneth Koch, whom she cites as having sparked her interest in spoken word. Daou ultimately graduated cum laude with a visual arts and art history degree from Barnard College/Columbia and frequently appeared in her senior year at Postcrypt Coffeehouse, the university's on-campus poetry lounge.

== Career ==
=== Beginnings and Head Music ===
While still a student, Daou began her career recording for NuGroove Records, one of New York's underground electronica labels. Demos that Daou had recorded caught the attention of two NuGroove DJs, and they invited her to provide guest vocals on a developing track. The experiment led to the label's top-selling single "It Could Not Happen", which later was released on Network Records in the United Kingdom. Daou also performed as "Vandal" at Los Angeles' Stranger Than Fiction rave at the Shrine Auditorium in 1990.

Daou's underground success brought her to the attention of Columbia Records, which signed her to a seven-album record deal. Daou, along with a five-piece band released Head Music as The Daou in 1992. An airy fusion of rock, jazz and funk, Head Music enjoyed moderate success and received praiseworthy reviews in the New York Times Sunday Arts & Leisure section and CREAM and Billboard magazines. The album's first single "Surrender Yourself" was remixed by Danny Tenaglia and reached No. 1 on Billboard's Dance Chart. Creative disagreements with Columbia would see Daou negotiate out of her contract and subsequently release Head Music's next two singles for the independent Tribal Records.

=== MCA years: Zipless and Slow to Burn ===
In 1994 Daou, now billed as a solo act, recorded Zipless, a sexually charged collection of pieces inspired by the work of the poet/novelist Erica Jong. A slight stylistic evolution from Head Music, Zipless employed a somewhat more synthesized sound and introduced Daou's foray into recorded spoken word. Daou released Zipless on her own label, Lotus Records. The album quickly established a cult following and attracted the attention of Bob Krasnow, the music A&R executive whose artist signings include Anita Baker, Björk, Natalie Merchant and Metallica. Krasnow signed Daou to his fledgling MCA Records subsidiary Krasnow Entertainment and re-released Zipless in 1995.

Zipless garnered favorable international press, with features and reviews in Time, Billboard Spotlight Review, Bikini, Vibe, Wire, Mix Mag, URB, the Toronto Star and Le Monde, among other publications. The first single, "Near the Black Forest", was featured in heavy rotation on VH1 and, along with follow-up single "Sunday Afternoons", enjoyed moderate radio rotation. Daou toured nationally with New York rapper Guru and his hip hop-jazz fusion project Jazzmatazz, playing at venues such as L.A.'s House of Blues, Bimbo's 365 Club in San Francisco and Lee's Palace in Toronto.

In 1995 MCA underwent significant management changes, at which time the company faltered on the momentum that had been building for several months around Zipless. Daou recorded a sophomore solo album, Slow to Burn, and released it in the Fall of that year. With each song a vignette inspired by the biographies of such celebrated female artisans as Billie Holiday, Gertrude Stein, and Frida Kahlo, Slow To Burn enjoyed moderate to heavy smooth jazz format radio play with its first single "Two to Tango". It was featured in reviews in VIBE, URB, Billboard, Curve, and Cover magazines. "Two to Tango" was remixed by Danny Tenaglia and reached the top of Billboard's Dance Chart, remaining at No. 1 for three weeks. It was featured in the Matthew Perry film Fools Rush In. Two other songs from the album, "If I Could (What I Would Do For You)" and "How Do You Feel?", were featured in the films An American Werewolf in Paris and Idle Hands, respectively.

In the winter of 1996 Seagram took over MCA and Doug Morris, a reputed adversary of Bob Krasnow, became president of the record label. Krasnow soon retired and folded his namesake label. Daou chose to leave as well, and negotiated out of her contract with MCA.

=== A return to the indie world: Plutonium Glow, Dear John Coltrane and Make You Love ===
Over the next couple years Daou again chose to release her records independently. With some support from Benny Medina/Handprint Entertainment, she released 1997's dancy, cosmic exploration-themed Plutonium Glow, on her own DaouMusic label. The project was one of the earliest albums by a former major-label artist to be marketed and sold on the internet. The online release was followed by a 1998 UK re-release by independent international distributor Oxygen Music Works. This latter version featured an alternate song sequencing and a new track, "Alive", in place of "Visions of You".

Artwork from the Plutonium Glow era was showcased in an exhibit called "Plutonium Show" at Untitled (SPACE) Gallery in New Haven, Connecticut. A piece from the show entitled "Music Box" subsequently went on for display at a National Arts Club student exhibition, securing the Jeffrey Seyfert Memorial Prize.

In 1999, Daou released Dear John Coltrane on the Oxygen imprint. More nostalgic in the vein of Slow to Burn than danceable like Plutonium Glow, the homage to the legendary jazz saxophonist met with warm reception by fans, but sparse marketing, press, club and radio support.

Daou's next album Make You Love, inspired by the travails of a girlfriend living in Paris, was co-released in 2000 on Daou's own label imprint and EMI in France. Generally positive reviews for Make You Love were featured in Le Monde, Elle, Magic, and Billboard Spotlight Review, and many critics received the album as Daou's most pop-oriented. The album's song "Julliette" was used in a scene for U.S. television series Dawson's Creek; the single "A Little Bit of Pain" was used in Lifetime TV movie Sex, Lies and Obsession; and in the fall of 2000 Daou promoted the project as guest on a seven-week concert tour of France by pop vocalist Etienne Daho. The song "Make Believe" from Plutonium Glow was re-recorded as a duet with Daho for his Corps et armes album.

=== Hiatus and return: Joe Sent Me, Love Among the Shadowed Things and Light Sweet Crude ===
On the heels of Make You Love, Daou would take a seven-year hiatus from releasing new material. Her catalog was tapped for various music compilations and for the soundtrack to 2005 French film Lila Says, but Daou would devote this time largely to visual arts, writing and academic pursuits.

In 2007, Daou announced on her official website that various pieces created since Make You Love were being compiled for an upcoming multimedia release, introduced under the working title Then, at Midnight. The project, ostensibly a new music album with related graphical content, ultimately would undergo a name change to Joe Sent Me, a passphrase used to navigate freely among the clandestine U.S. Prohibition-era speakeasy subculture. Several pivotal moments during Daou's hiatus would shape her new output—the September 11, 2001, terrorist attack on New York, where she then resided; and inspiring travel experiences among them.

On May 19, 2008, audio clips, lyrics and interactive graphic content heralding Joe Sent Me premiered on the website for the Barcelona Poetry Symposium. The material thereafter became available on Daou's own site, and the album itself was released in November 2008 via Daou's online marketplace. In May 2009, a program of original dances based on the music of Joe Sent Me debuted at Mercer County Community College's Kelsey Theatre, performed by the school's Mercer Dance Ensemble.

On January 31, 2010, a collection of four tone poems from Daou, collectively titled Love Among the Shadowed Things, debuted on the seasonal Weird Tales for Winter segment of Jonny Mugwump & The Exotic Pylon, an experimental radio series broadcasting on London's community radio/Radio Art-format Resonance 104.4 FM. Composed around the themes "Dream", "Snow", "Shadow" and "Night", the poems that comprise Love Among the Shadowed Things are stream-of-consciousness collages of spoken word, sparse free jazz accompaniment and thickly layered sound effects. Daou describes this aural meditation on a particular December night as a juxtapositioning of things "secular and temporal ... familiar ... mystifying ... universal and eternal."

In summer 2012, Daou's official website announced the online streaming debut of song "Revolution". The track would be included as a feature remix on Noozik – Volume 1, a collaborative music release between New York fashion house Nooka and digital indie music label Synth Records. Daou's website also announced that the original version of "Revolution" would appear on an upcoming 2013 album: Light Sweet Crude. Employing an array of producers, Light Sweet Crude (Act I: Hybrid) on its release would bear arguably a broader and more pronounced influence of discrete musical styles—e.g. house music, reggae, hip hop, and symphonic—than prior projects. Lyrically, too, Light Sweet Crude would see Daou expand into new territory: Where earlier work all but exclusively explored the tumult of personal angst and interpersonal liaisons, those matters in Light Sweet Crude become corollary to such geopolitical phenomena as revolution and war.

"I would say it has something to do with my own growing awareness and perception that politics is no longer something that exists outside of ourselves," Daou has said. "There is no longer much, if any, separation between what happens outside in the world and what happens inside ourselves."

== Discography ==
=== Albums ===
- Head Music (with The Daou) – 1992
- Zipless – 1994
- Slow to Burn – 1996
- Plutonium Glow – 1997/1998 (two releases)
- Dear John Coltrane – 1999
- Make You Love – 2000
- Joe Sent Me – 2008
- Sweet Light Crude (Act 1: Hybrid) – 2013
- Welcome to My Blues: An Anthology (1994–2017) – 2017

=== Singles ===
- "Near the Black Forest"
- "Sunday Afternoons"
- "Two to Tango"
- "How Do You Feel"
- "A Little Bit of Pain"
- "Consequences"
- "Heart of Wax"
- "Revolution"
- "Danger Ahead"
- "Trouble Comes"

== See also ==
- Acid jazz
- Fusion
