= Plutonium Glow =

- Cover to the more available Oxygen Music 1998 re-release

Studio album by Vanessa Daou
- Released: 1997
- Genre: Dance; electronic
- Length: 51:29
- Language: English
- Label: Handprint Entertainment
- Producer: Peter Daou

Vanessa Daou chronology
Slow to Burn (1995)	Plutonium Glow (1997)	Dear John Coltrane (1999)

Plutonium Glow is a 1997 studio album by American vocalist Vanessa Daou that was re-released in 1998. The album was an early example of Internet-based marketing for music and has received positive reviews from critics.

== Reception ==
Editors at AllMusic rated this album 4 out of 5 stars, with critic Stanton Swihart writing that "Plutonium Glow... while still intensely sweaty, shifts its focus to the stars" and "Daou has a voice like a feather that literally floats off into the crisp night air, leaving the listener with a sweet but sometimes sorrowful aftertaste". A review in Billboard calling this a "fine" album that "meld[s] sensual, often enlightening lyrics with smooth, warmly ambient dance grooves". A 2022 review from Imran Khan of PopMatters of the 1998 re-release edition of this album stated that this album was influential on subsequent rave music culture and he praised the music's "subtle change in dynamics" and "coolly-mannered, thoughtful, and thought-provoking poetry".

== Track listing ==
All songs written by Peter Daou and Vanessa Daou.

1997 Handprint Entertainment release

1. "Life on a Distant Star" – 4:12
2. "Plutonium Glow" – 3:58
3. "Peculiar" – 3:50
4. "Make Believe" – 3:53
5. "Lightening" – 1:55
6. "Zero G" – 4:18
7. "Mouth to Mouth" – 3:59
8. "Red Dawn" – 3:04
9. "Cherries in the Snow" – 3:41
10. "Flower of My Fears" – 2:03
11. "How Far" – 3:50
12. "Visions of You" – 4:01
13. "Truth Remains" – 2:56
14. "Back to the World" – 5:58

1998 Oxygen Music re-release

1. "Alive" – 4:09
2. "Make Believe" – 3:51
3. "Peculiar" – 3:49
4. "Back to the World" – 5:57
5. "Life on a Distant Star" – 4:12
6. "Zero G" – 4:18
7. "Mouth to Mouth" – 3:59
8. "Truth Remains" – 2:54
9. "Lightening" – 1:53
10. "Plutonium Glow" – 3:58
11. "Flower of My Fears" – 2:02
12. "Cherries in the Snow" – 3:42
13. "How Far" – 3:49
14. "Red Dawn" – 3:05

== Personnel ==
- Vanessa Daou – vocals, artwork, design, art direction, executive production
- Peter Daou – mixing, production
- Deena Del Zotto – photography
- Rick Essig – mastering at Frankford/Wayne, New York City, New York, United States
- MarkArt – graphics
- Craig Roseberry – executive production

== See also ==
- List of 1997 albums
- List of 1998 albums
