= Make You Love =

Studio album by Vanessa Daou
- Released: 2000
- Recorded: 1999–2000
- Genre: Pop; trip hop; electronica; downtempo
- Length: 46:05
- Label: EQ8R; EMI
- Producer: Peter Daou

Vanessa Daou chronology
| Dear John Coltrane (1999) | Make You Love (2000) | Joe Sent Me (2008) |

Professional ratings
Review scores
| Source | Rating |
|---|---|
| AllMusic | 2.5/5 stars |
| Slant Magazine | 2.5/5 stars |

Make You Love is the fifth solo album by singer Vanessa Daou, released in 2000.

== Critical reception ==
AllMusic called the album "mature and confident." Billboard called it "easily the artist's most honest, pop-leaning, and ... best collection to date."

== Track listing ==
1. "You" – 3:52
2. "A Little Bit of Pain" – 2:54
3. "Mess Around" – 3:52
4. "Make You Love" – 4:26
5. "Show Me" – 3:55
6. "Lovechild" – 4:15
7. "Aphrodite" – 3:38
8. "I Would for You" – 4:26
9. "A Little Bit of Pain (II)" – 4:08
10. "Juliette" – 3:46
11. "Honey in a Jar" – 2:57
12. "Bittersweet" – 3:56
