= Tim Carpenter (activist) =

American activist

Tim Carpenter (c. 1959 - Apr. 28, 2014) was an American activist and educator. He was a co-founder and the executive director of Progressive Democrats of America.

== Education ==
Carpenter graduated from California State University, Fullerton with bachelor's degrees in History and Political Science, and a master's degree in history. He taught U.S. History and Government in California at the high school and community college level.

== Political work ==
Carpenter worked on the George McGovern 1972 presidential campaign in Orange County, California. He had roles in the Jesse Jackson 1988 presidential campaign and Jerry Brown 1992 presidential campaign. He was a Democratic National Convention delegate in 1992. He was Deputy National Campaign Manager for the Dennis Kucinich 2004 presidential campaign.

In 2004, Carpenter was a co-founder of the Progressive Democrats of America (PDA). The PDA called for Howard Dean to run for Democratic National Committee chairman.

Carpenter advocated for single-payer healthcare and called for the Bernie Sanders 2016 presidential campaign.

== Personal life ==
Tim had a wife Barbara and two daughters. He died of melanoma in Northampton, Massachusetts on April 28, 2014.
