= Alan Minsky =

American political activist

- Born: August 5, 1965 (age 60); Berkeley, California, U.S.
- Education: Yale University
- Occupation: Executive Director of the Progressive Democrats of America

Alan Minsky (born August 5, 1965) is the executive director of Progressive Democrats of America (PDA). Before joining PDA in 2018, Minsky worked as a political journalist with Pacifica Radio, wrote a series of books on American sports history, and published articles on both politics and sports.

== Early life ==
Alan Minsky is the son of economist Hyman Minsky. Born in Berkeley, California, on August 5, 1965, Minsky was raised in St. Louis, Missouri, other than the years he spent in Cambridge, United Kingdom (1969–70) and Rome, Italy (1978–79), when his father was on sabbatical from Washington University in St. Louis.

Minsky attended Yale University as an undergraduate, where he was one of six students arrested protesting the CIA in a celebrated case that came to be known as the "CIA Six." The group was ultimately let off with a slap on the wrist. Minsky graduated from Yale in 1988.

== Sports writing and journalism ==
In the decade after college, Minsky authored three books on American sports history: Home Run Kings, Kings of the Court, and March to the Finals. His fourth book, A Game for All Races, was published under a pseudonym, Henry Metcalfe.

Minsky was one of the founding members of LA Indymedia in 2000. This launched his career as a political journalist.

He was hired as Senior Producer at KPFK Pacifica Radio Los Angeles in 2003, a position he held until becoming the station's interim Program Director in early 2009. He remained in this role until 2018, becoming the station's longest serving Program Director.

During his tenure at Pacifica, he frequently produced national political coverage, and was the coordinator of national programming from 2015 through 2018. In 2011, he wrote a long internal memo, entitled Building a Powerful Pacifica, that proposed many changes for the troubled radio network. The document became a rallying point for many of the network's supporters. An updated version of the memo was published in full by Truthdig in 2014.

Minsky launched many notable shows during his time at KPFK, including the Ralph Nader Radio Hour, The Jimmy Dore Show, Axis of Justice (with Tom Morello and Serj Tankian) and Think Outside the Cage. He remains the producer or executive producer for four podcasts he started: The Nation's Start Making Sense, Jacobin's Jacobin Radio, The Los Angeles Review of Books' LARB Radio Hour, and the Ralph Nader Radio Hour.

Over the past 25 years, Minsky has written dozens of articles for Truthdig, The Nation, Common Dreams, and other outlets.

== Political activism ==
Minsky was hired as the third executive director of Progressive Democrats of America in September 2018.

In early 2019, Minsky launched an affiliated non-profit, Progressives for Democracy in America (also known as PDA), which had no limits on its advocacy or lobbying at the federal, state, or local level.

Through the new non-profit, Minsky initiated a nationwide constituent lobbying program, PDA's Congressional Liaison program, through which citizens directly petitioned their U.S. Congressperson and/or Senator to support progressive federal legislation. The program focused on building support for the progressive agenda in Congress. Within weeks of the program's launch, it had a designated liaison for almost every Democratic seat in both houses.

In the following Congress, Food and Water Watch and PDA partnered on a Congressional Climate Liaison program, modeled after PDA's general program, but focused solely on environmental legislation.

In early 2021, Minsky lead a joint effort with Progressive Democrats of America, Our Revolution, Roots Action, and the Bernie Delegates Network, to form a new organization that would convene leaders from the Progressives Caucuses of each state's Democratic Party in order to create greater cohesion among Progressive Party activists across the country. This became the State Democratic Party Progressive Network, which currently brings together representatives from progressive bodies that operate inside over 40 state democratic parties across the country. Minsky is a founding Steering Committee Member of the organization.

Under Minsky's leadership, PDA has re-confirmed and strengthened its commitment to a zero-carbon environmental policy commensurate with climate science, to equality and civil rights for all people, to economic and social policies designed to eradicate structural racism, and to recasting of U.S. foreign policy so that it truly prioritizes international law and human rights. However, Minsky's signature contribution to PDA has been the foregrounding of economic policies designed to re-establish a prosperous and secure middle class as the dominant feature of American society.

=== A 21st Century Economic Bill of Rights ===
Central to this agenda is support for a 21st Century Economic Bill of Rights. Minsky has co-authored four articles with history Professor Harvey J. Kaye, advocating for an updated version of President Franklin D. Roosevelt's Second Bill of Rights to be the defining policy of the progressive wing of the Party since it speaks directly to the primary concerns of the majority of Americans.

Minsky and Kaye's 21st Century Economic Bill of Rights will guarantee to all Americans:

1. A useful job that pays a living wage.
2. A voice in the workplace through a union and collective bargaining.
3. Comprehensive quality healthcare.
4. Complete cost-free public education and access to broadband internet.
5. Decent, safe, affordable housing.
6. A clean environment and a healthy planet.
7. A meaningful endowment of resources at birth, and a secure retirement.
8. Sound banking and financial services.
9. An equitable and economically fair justice system.
10. Recreation and participation in civic and democratic life.

Minsky has also co-authored a Rural New Deal proposal with PDA's Dave Alba and Anthony Flaccavento, the co-founder and Director of the Rural Urban Bridge Initiative (RUBI). The Rural New Deal addresses the roots of the economic and social problems faced by millions across rural and small-town America; and proposes policies and programs designed to lift poor and working-class households up into the middle class. Minsky has announced that he is working on parallel proposals, also co-authored with experts, that address the endemic poverty concentrated in the urban core (A 21st Template for Urban Renewal), the Southeast (A Progressive Southern Strategy), and Indigenous communities across the continent. All four of these regional anti-poverty/pro-middle class platforms complement the national policy framework of the 21st Century Economic Bill of Rights.

PDA's Progressive Central conference, held at Chicago Teachers Union Headquarters on August 18–19, 2024, was also Minsky's brainchild. The most ambitious event in PDA's history was probably the largest gathering of progressive leaders ever held during DNC week. Bernie Sanders and Nina Turner were keynote speakers. Representatives Pramila Jayapal and Ro Khanna both spoke numerous times. Twelve other progressive members of Congress participated, as did four Union Presidents, an array of state and local elected officials, candidates, authors, academics, organizers, and grassroots activists.
