= Peter Daou =

American political activist and jazz musician (born 1965)

- Born: 1965 (age 60–61); Beirut, Lebanon
- Education: American University of Beirut; New York University
- Political party: Independent (2020–present); Democratic (before 2020)
- Spouse: Vanessa Daou (divorced)
- Relatives: Erica Jong (aunt); Molly Jong-Fast (cousin)

Peter Daou (born 1965) is a Lebanese-American political activist, musician, and author. A former member of the Democratic Party and advisor to Hillary Clinton's 2008 campaign, Daou served as the campaign manager for Marianne Williamson's presidential campaign in the 2024 Democratic primaries for the month of April 2023, before joining the Independent presidential campaign of Cornel West as campaign manager in September 2023.

== Early life ==
Daou was born in Beirut and lived there for part of the Lebanese Civil War. At 15, he says he was conscripted by the Lebanese Forces, a Christian militia, and underwent three years of military training alongside his schooling. He attended the American University of Beirut, and amid ongoing strife in Lebanon, moved to New York to study philosophy at New York University. Daou's father was Catholic and Daou was baptized into his father's faith. Daou is of Jewish descent on his mother's side; his mother is an American who was born and raised in New York.

== Career ==
=== Music ===
During the 1990s, Daou was a producer and keyboardist, appearing on hundreds of remixes and recordings by artists including Björk, Frankie Knuckles, Miles Davis, Mariah Carey, and Diana Ross. A jazz pianist, he produced three #1 Billboard Club singles and was signed to Columbia Records and Universal Music Group. He toured the U.S. and Europe, and was featured in Vibe, Spin, Billboard, and Time. He and then-wife Vanessa Daou also formed a New York City-based dance music group, and made a number of recordings in the 1990s, initially under the name The Daou and then under the solo name Vanessa Daou. Their 1992 debut single "Surrender Yourself" briefly reached number one on the Billboard Dance Club Songs chart. Daou also co-wrote and produced two other number one Billboard Dance Club singles, "Sunday Afternoons" and "Two To Tango." A 1994 album Zipless was a concept album based on the novel Fear of Flying by Peter Daou's aunt Erica Jong.

=== Politics ===
Daou was an online communications adviser to the John Kerry 2004 presidential campaign. In 2006, when he was hired as a consultant by the Hillary Clinton campaign, The New York Times described him as "one of the most prominent political bloggers in the nation."

According to The Washington Post in 2007, Daou was seen by early political bloggers "as the Yoda of the blogosphere because of the Daou Report, a comprehensive snapshot of the Web's blue and red blogs that he wrote until joining the Clinton campaign." He led Hillary Clinton's digital operation in her 2008 campaign and was an outspoken Clinton advocate in 2016.

During the 2020 primaries, Daou penned an op-ed for The Nation in which he implored Democrats, progressives, and leftists to move past their 2016 battles over the candidacy of Bernie Sanders, uniting behind a shared goal of defeating Trump. In November 2019, he appeared on the Sanders campaign "Hear the Bern" podcast in support of the #NotMeUs movement. In March 2020, he explained on The Intercept his support for Sanders and insights gained from past experience working for the Democratic Party's establishment.

In 2019, Daou and his wife, Leela, became advisors to the progressive congressional campaigns of Lindsey Boylan (NY-10), Lauren Ashcraft (NY-12), Rebecca Parson (WA-06), and Melanie D'Arrigo (NY-03).

In April 2020, Daou posted on Twitter that he was leaving the Democratic Party.

On February 14, 2022, Daou posted a tweet where he denounced capitalism and stated that he considers himself a non-specific "leftist". However, he views David Graeber as an influence and sympathizes with anarchism.

In April 2023, Daou announced that he was joining the presidential campaign of Marianne Williamson as her campaign manager. He said he joined her campaign "because I've known her for years and deeply appreciate her lifelong dedication to helping people." In May 2023, Daou announced on Twitter that he was resigning from his position as campaign manager for Marianne Williamson's presidential campaign. A few days later in a joint statement with the campaign, he cited his and his wife Leela Daou's obligations to care for their ailing parents.

On September 10, 2023, Daou became the campaign manager of 2024 Green Party presidential candidate Cornel West. Daou told New Yorker interviewer Isaac Chotiner that "there has been a systemic eradication of all the routes that third parties can take, which is a violation of the Fourteenth Amendment. Let alone this constantly propagandistic vote shaming. Vote shaming is voter suppression." In October 2023, Daou described West's decision to leave the Green Party to run for president as an independent by saying West wanted "to be 100 percent laser-focused on people as opposed to the party process." On October 26, 2023, Daou announced via X (formerly Twitter) that he was resigning from West's campaign over "ongoing emotional distress" from the Gaza war, its effects in Gaza and the Biden administration's response.

=== Media ===
Daou served as the chief executive of Shareblue Media (now The American Independent) and the co-founder of the media platform Verrit, which was shut down in 2018.

Daou and James Boyce claimed to have performed a founding role in the Huffington Post and said they were shut out of any profits from its sale to AOL. A suit was filed in 2010 by Daou and Boyce, which was settled in 2014.

Daou is the author of Digital Civil War: Confronting the Far-Right Menace.
