= Verrit =

2017–18 American political website

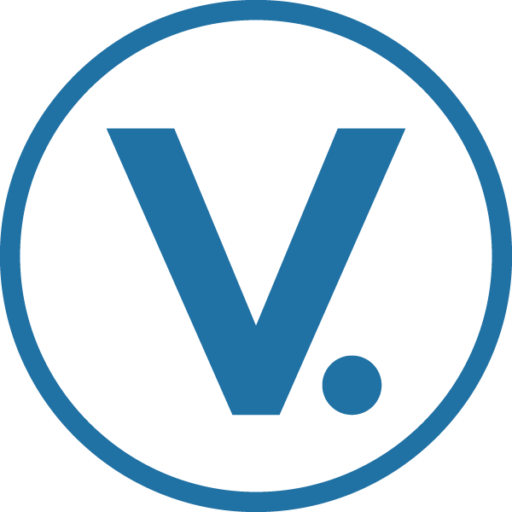
Verrit's logo

Verrit was a liberal-leaning political site created by Peter Daou and his wife Leela Daou that showed talking points in card format for use in social media discussions. Each card contained a seven-digit identification code, allowing readers to verify that the card's content was unaltered.

The website's slogan was "media for the 65.8 million," referring to the number of votes Hillary Clinton received in the 2016 presidential election. Peter Daou, an adviser to Clinton's 2008 presidential campaign, and prior chief executive of Shareblue, told Business Insider that he intended the website to "reflect the worldview" of those who voted for Clinton and described the site as an "online hub for Clinton backers so that they can find easy-to-share facts, stats and other information you can take out to social media when you're having debates on key issues people are discussing". Daou also stated that the website had no financial ties to Clinton.

On September 3, 2017, Clinton endorsed the service. Shortly thereafter, the site went offline, which Daou blamed on a "significant and sophisticated" cyber attack. Five months later, the site remained offline. When a journalist for Splinter News contacted company representatives requesting comment on its status, he reports he was blocked by the company's Twitter account.

Verrit suspended all functionality, including verifying previously-issued cards, on February 11, 2018. The website was replaced with the words "Reboots Summer 2018". No warning or explanation was given for the suspension. The domain currently redirects to a private Twitter profile.

== Reception ==
Abby Ohlheiser at The Washington Post said the site is "supposed to be something that's useful for Clinton supporters who like to argue online about politics". TechCrunch called it "a fledgling media startup that's aiming to provide a platform for Hillary supporters to look at infographics with quotes on them about stuff they agree with". Politico's Jack Shafer described Verrit as "a propaganda rag so shameless it would make Kim Jong Un blush". The Observer wrote, "We didn't find any outright fabrications, but we did find signs that the site is more focused on advancing its messaging than proper sourcing". Matthew Hews from TheNextWeb wrote, "From the get-go, it's apparent that Verrit isn't about building bridges or creating understanding, but rather pushing a particular narrative. Daou himself has said as much." The Verge said it is "just another partisan showroom for original reporting, controlled by someone with an axe to grind".
