= Cara Silverman =

American film editor (1959–2014)

- Born: September 24, 1959; New York, United States
- Died: September 22, 2014 (aged 54); Los Angeles, California, United States
- Occupation: Film editor

Cara Ruth Silverman (September 24, 1959 - September 22, 2014) was an American film editor.

Born in New York City, Silverman received a degree in political science from American University, then took an internship at WNET in New York. She began her career as an assistant editor on projects such as The Bonfire of the Vanities, Cape Fear and A Bronx Tale, then secured her first solo project with Party Girl.

Silverman frequently collaborated with several directors: John Whitesell (See Spot Run, Malibu's Most Wanted), Mark Rosman (A Cinderella Story, The Perfect Man), Ken Kwapis (He's Just Not That Into You, Big Miracle) and James Gunn (Super, Movie 43).

Silverman was busy working on several projects shortly before her death on September 22, 2014.

== Filmography ==
Editor
Year	Film	Director	Notes
1995	Party Girl	Daisy von Scherler Mayer	First collaboration with Daisy von Scherler Mayer
1995	Jeffrey	Christopher Ashley	
1997	Touch	Paul Schrader	
1998	Permanent Midnight	David Veloz	
1999	The Best Man	Malcolm D. Lee	
2001	Head over Heels	Mark Waters	
2001	See Spot Run	John Whitesell	First collaboration with John Whitesell
2002	The Guru	Daisy von Scherler Mayer	Second collaboration with Daisy von Scherler Mayer
2003	Malibu's Most Wanted	John Whitesell	Second collaboration with John Whitesell
2004	A Cinderella Story	Mark Rosman	First collaboration with Mark Rosman
2005	The Perfect Man	Mark Rosman	Second collaboration with Mark Rosman
2008	Keith	Todd Kessler	
2009	The Greatest	Shana Feste	
2009	He's Just Not That into You	Ken Kwapis	First collaboration with Ken Kwapis
2010	Super	James Gunn	First collaboration with James Gunn
2012	Big Miracle	Ken Kwapis	Second collaboration with Ken Kwapis
2013	Movie 43	James Gunn	"Beezel" segment Second collaboration with James Gunn
