= Progressive Democrats of America =

US political organization

- Abbreviation: PDA
- Formation: 2004; 22 years ago
- Type: Political action committee
- Headquarters: Grand Rapids, Michigan, U.S.
- Key people: Conor Boylan, board president Alan Minsky, executive director
- Website: pdamerica.org

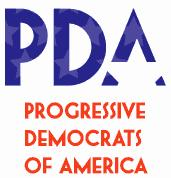
Logo of Progressive Democrats of America.

Progressive Democrats of America is an American political action committee that was founded in the summer of 2004 by Kevin Spidel, the National Field Director for the Kucinich for President campaign and Tim Carpenter, the Deputy Campaign Manager for Kucinich and activists from the Howard Dean and Dennis Kucinich campaigns with the goal to make the Democratic Party more progressive.

== History ==
PDA was formed in Roxbury, Boston, in 2004 by activists from the Howard Dean and Dennis Kucinich campaigns.

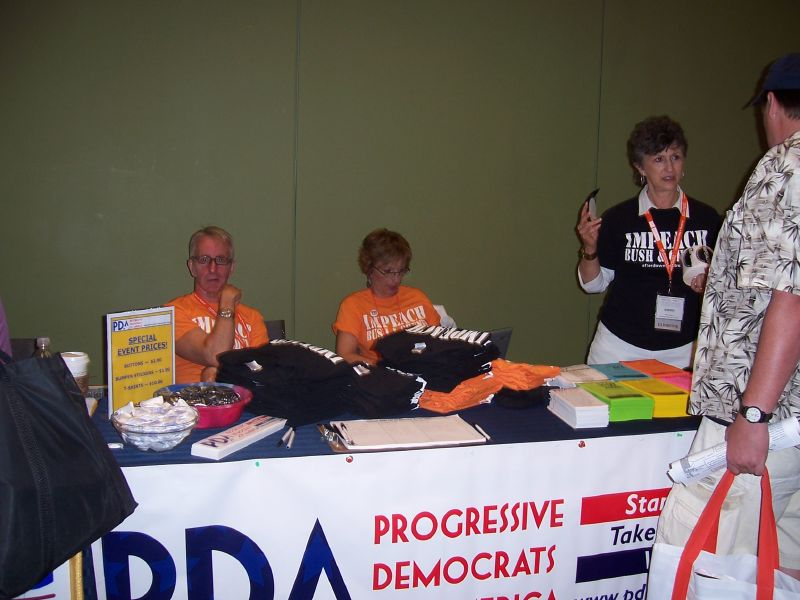
Progressive Democrats of America in 2007

In 2007, PDA had 110,000 members and 136 chapters.

In 2014, PDA ran a "Run Bernie Run" petition drive to draft Bernie Sanders for the 2016 Democratic Party presidential primaries.

PDA operates both inside and outside the Democratic Party.

== Policy positions ==
PDA supported policies including single-payer healthcare and ending the Iraq War.
