= Jonathan Fast =

American author and social work teacher

- Born: April 13, 1948 (age 78); New York City, New York, U.S.
- Education: Princeton University (BA); Columbia University (MSW); Yeshiva University (PhD)
- Spouses: Erica Jong (m. 1977; div. 1982): Barbara Fast
- Children: 3, including Molly
- Relatives: Howard Fast (father)

Jonathan Fast (born April 13, 1948) is an American author and social work teacher.

== Life and career ==
Fast was born in New York City. He attended Princeton University, and earned graduate degrees at Columbia University and Yeshiva University. He has a daughter, Molly Jong-Fast, from his first marriage, to author Erica Jong, and two sons from his marriage to Barbara Fast, a Unitarian minister.

Fast's nonfiction book, Ceremonial Violence: A Psychological Explanation of School Shootings (2008), analyzes five school shootings from a psychological perspective: Cleveland Elementary School shooting (San Diego), the Columbine High School massacre, the 1992 Bard College at Simon's Rock shooting, the 1997 Bethel Regional High School shooting, and the 1997 Pearl High School shooting.

As of 2017, Fast was a professor of social work at the Wurzweiler School of Social Work at Yeshiva University.

His father, Howard Fast (1914–2003), was the author of many best-selling novels, including Spartacus (1951), which became the basis for the 1960 film of the same name.

== Publications ==
- Science fiction
  - The Secrets of Synchronicity (1977)
  - Mortal Gods (1978)
  - The Inner Circle (1979)
  - Prisoner of the Planets (1980)
  - The Beast (1981)
- Other fiction
  - The Golden Fire (1986)
  - The Jade Stalk (1988)
  - Stolen Time (1990)
- The Mesmer Stories
  - The Stable Boy (2024)
  - The Doctor's Apprentice (2024
- Adaptations
  - Newsies (1992)
- Non-fiction
  - Ceremonial Violence: a psychological explanation of school shootings (2008). ISBN 1-59-020047-0
  - Beyond bullying: breaking the cycle of shame, bullying, and violence (2015). ISBN 0-19-938364-2
