= Head Music (The Daou album) =

Studio album by the Daou
- Released: 1992
- Genre: Dance-pop
- Label: Columbia

The Daou chronology
| Head Music (1992) | Zipless solo (1994) |

Head Music is a 1992 album by the Daou. The album gained favorable critical reviews for its originality. CD Review wrote that "the Daou's debut album embraces dance-oriented Europop more whole-heartedly than any previous English-language release." The first single, "Surrender Yourself", spent 11 weeks at the top of the Dance Chart.

== Track listing ==
1. "Surrender Yourself" – 4:22
2. "Skin Deep" – 4:15
3. "Sympathy Bouquet" – 5:21
4. "Solitaire" – 3:52
5. "Never Ending Winter" – 4:28
6. "Figure in the Sand" – 3:59
7. "Her Universe" – 3:19
8. "What Are You Guilty Of?" – 6:06
9. "The Way" – 3:02
