= Erica Jong =

American novelist and poet (born 1942)

- Jong in 1977
- Born: Erica Mann; March 26, 1942 (age 84); New York City, U.S.
- Education: Barnard College (BA); Columbia University (MA)
- Occupations: Author; teacher
- Spouses: Michael Werthman (m. 1963, divorced) Allan Jong (m. 1966, divorced) Jonathan Fast (m. 1977, divorced) Kenneth David Burrows (m. 1989; died 2023)
- Children: Molly Jong-Fast
- Relatives: Peter Daou (nephew)
- Writing career
- Period: 1973–present
- Genres: Primarily fiction and poetry
- Notable works: Fear of Flying, Shylock's Daughter, Seducing the Demon
- Website: www.ericajong.com

Erica Jong (née Mann; born March 26, 1942) is an American novelist, satirist, and poet known particularly for her 1973 novel Fear of Flying. The book became famously controversial for its attitudes towards female sexuality and figured prominently in the development of second-wave feminism, selling over 37 million copies worldwide.

== Early life and education ==
Erica Mann was born in Manhattan, New York, on March 26, 1942. She is one of three daughters of Seymour Mann (died 2004), and Eda Mirsky (1911–2012). Her father was a businessman of Polish-Jewish ancestry who owned a gifts and home accessories company known for its mass production of porcelain dolls. Her mother was born in England of a Russian-Jewish immigrant family, and was a painter and textile designer who also designed dolls for her husband's company.

She has an elder sister, Suzanna, who married Lebanese businessman Arthur Daou, and a younger sister, Claudia, a social worker who married Gideon S. Oberweger (the chief executive officer of Seymour Mann Inc. until his death in 2006). Among her nephews is Peter Daou, a political strategist and former musician who in 1994 produced an album titled Zipless, a concept album based on Jong's novel Fear of Flying.

Mann attended the High School of Music & Art in Harlem, New York in the 1950s, where she developed her passion for art and writing. As a student at Barnard College in Manhattan, Jong edited the Barnard Literary Magazine and created poetry programs for WKCR, Columbia University's radio station.

In 1963, she graduated from Barnard College, and in 1965, she graduated from Columbia University with an MA in 18th century English Literature. She wrote her master's thesis on the representations of women in the poetry of Alexander Pope. During her time at Barnard, she married Michael Werthman in 1963, although they soon divorced. In 1966, she married Allan Jong, a Chinese American psychiatrist, whose surname she kept after their divorce.

== Career ==
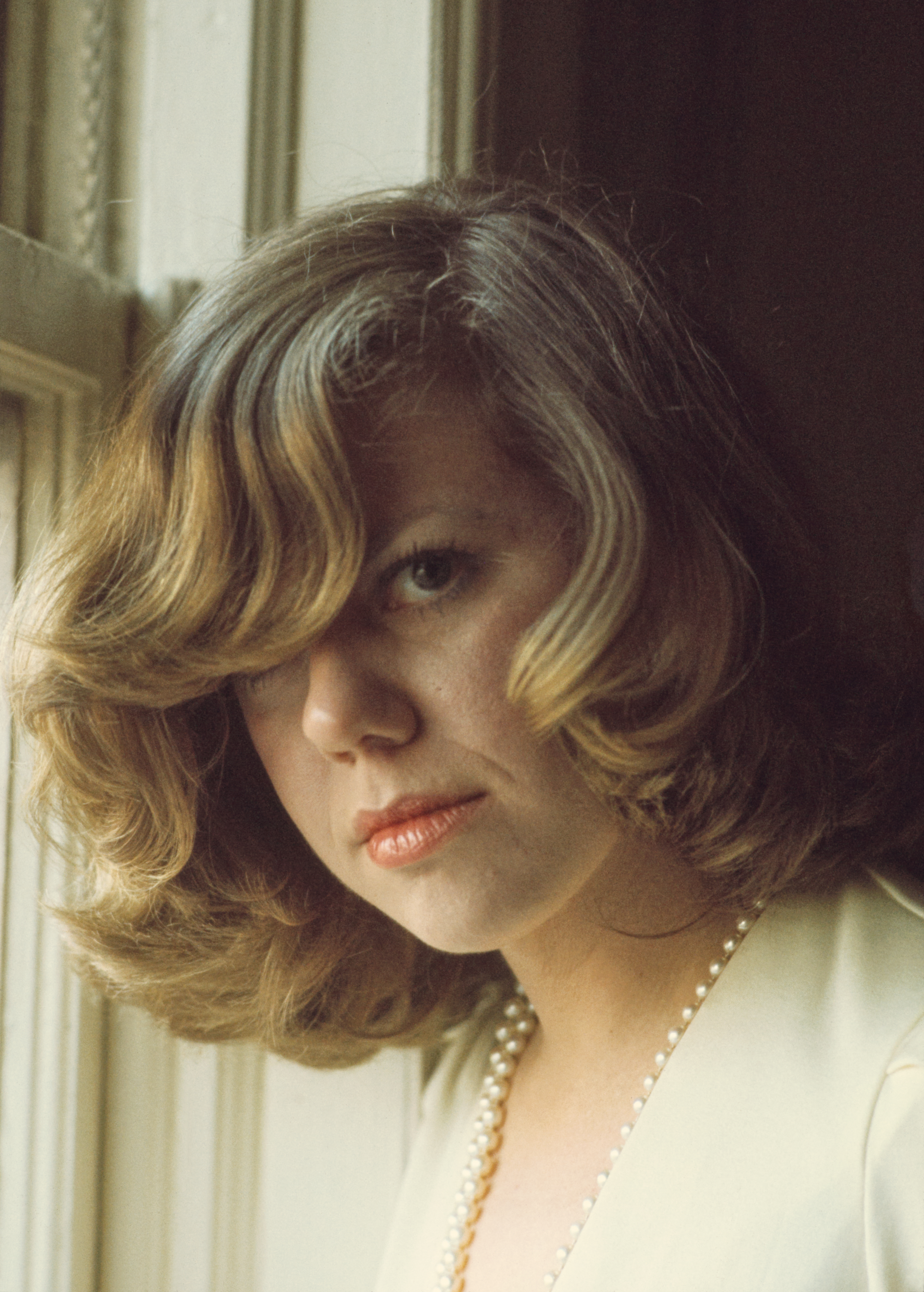
Erica Jong early in her career, photographed by Bernard Gotfryd, 1969

Jong is best known for her first novel, Fear of Flying (1973), which created a sensation with its frank treatment of a woman's sexual desires, through an account of Isadora Wing, a woman in her late twenties, searching for who she is and where she is going. Jong employed psychological and humorous descriptive elements, rich cultural and literary references, frank depictions of and ruminations on sex.

The book addresses some of the conflicts that were arising for women in late 1960s and early 1970s America – of womanhood, femininity, sex, and relationships, versus the quest for freedom and purpose. The saga of the thwarted fulfillment of Isadora Wing continues in two further novels, How to Save Your Own Life (1977) and Parachutes and Kisses (1984).

== Personal life ==
After her first two marriages ended in divorce, Jong married novelist and educator Jonathan Fast in 1977, son of novelist Howard Fast. Their marriage was described in How to Save Your Own Life and Parachutes and Kisses. She and Jonathan Fast have a daughter, Molly Jong-Fast. Jong's third marriage also ended in divorce. Jong and Kenneth David Burrows, a New York litigator, were married until his death on December 14, 2023. Molly Jong-Fast wrote a memoir about her relationship with her mother, titled How to Lose Your Mother. It was published in 2025.

Jong lived on an army base in Heidelberg, West Germany for three years (1966–69) with her second husband. She was a frequent visitor to Venice, Italy, and wrote about the city in her novel Shylock's Daughter. She lived in an apartment on the Upper East Side of Manhattan until 2023, and has also owned a house in Connecticut. In 2007, her literary archive was acquired by Columbia University in Manhattan.

Jong is mentioned in "Highlands", the closing song of Bob Dylan's Grammy Award-winning album Time Out of Mind (1997), as one of the "women authors" whose books the narrator reads. She is satirized on the MC Paul Barman track "N.O.W.", in which the rapper fantasizes about a young leftist carrying a fictitious Jong book titled America's Wrong. In 2008, Jong wrote in support of same-sex marriage, saying that "It certainly promotes stability and family... it's certainly good for kids."

In the early 2020s, Jong was diagnosed with dementia. As of 2025, she lives in a nursing home in Manhattan.

== Bibliography ==
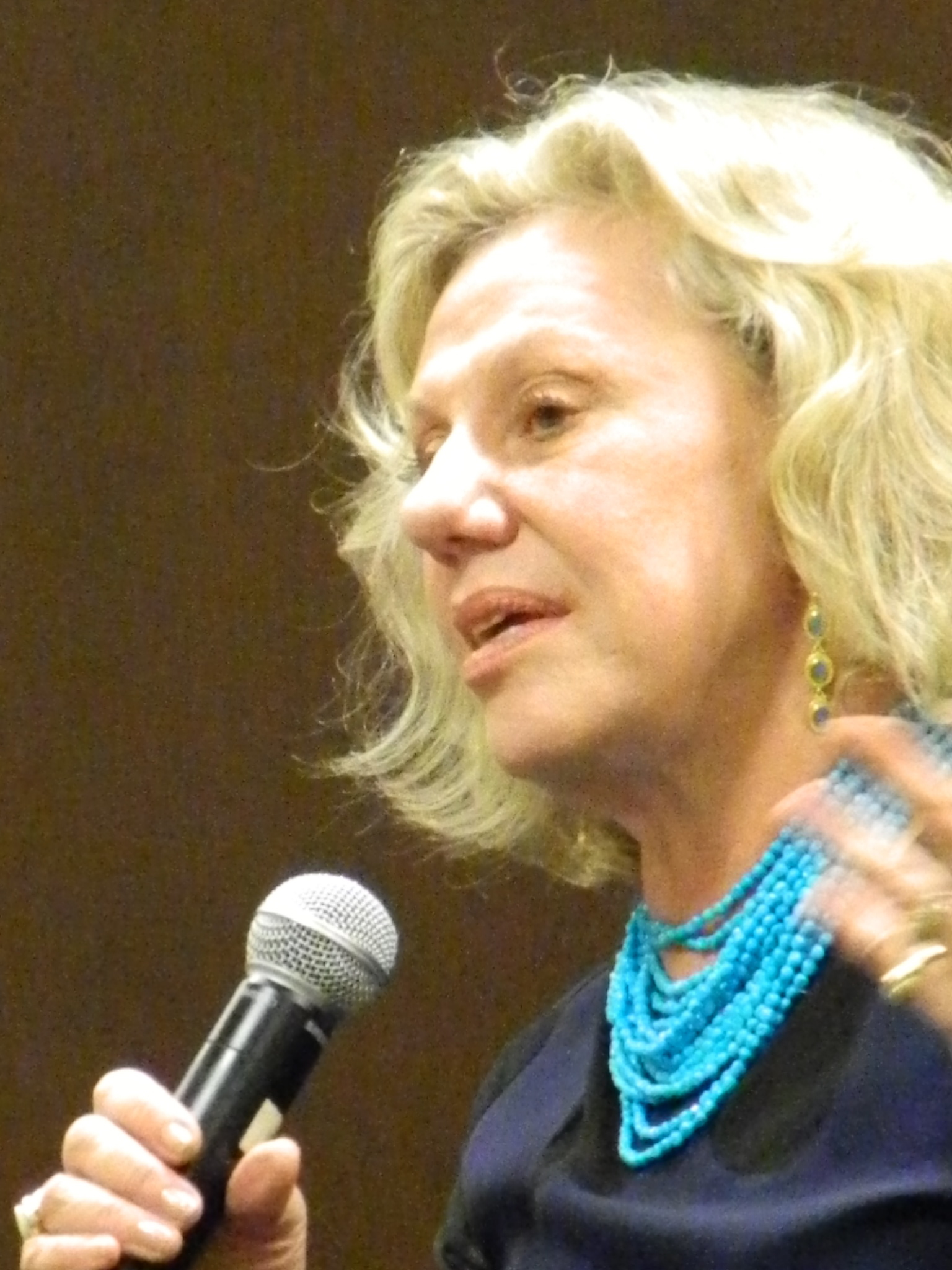
Erica Jong visiting Barnes & Noble in New York, September 2013

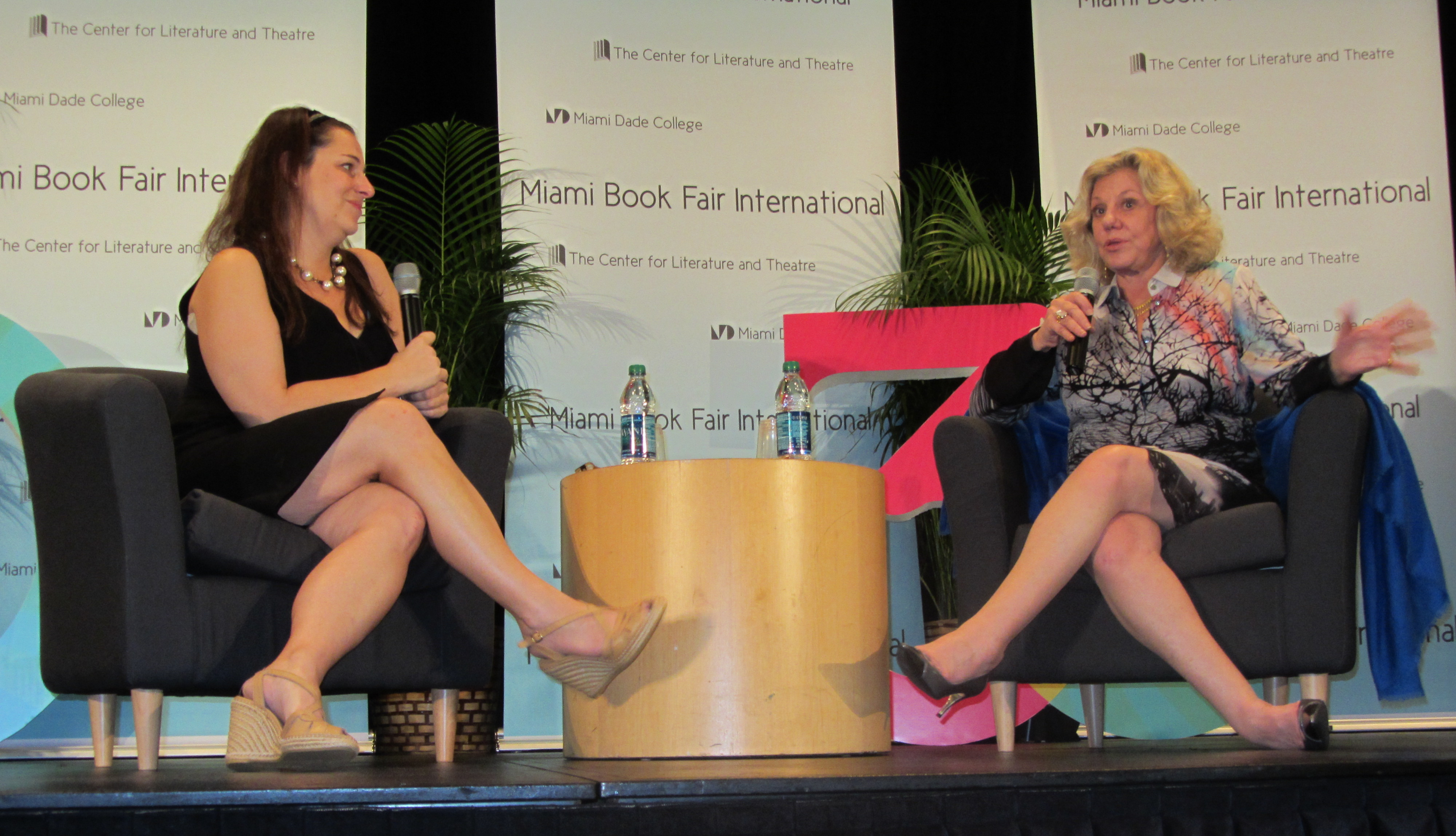
Jennifer Weiner and Erica Jong at the 2013 Miami Book Fair International

=== Fiction ===
- Jong, Erica (1973). Fear of Flying (Penguin Classics deluxe ed.). New York: Penguin Books. ISBN 9780143107354.
- Jong, Erica (1977). How to Save Your Own Life: A Novel (1st ed.). New York: Holt, Rinehart and Winston. ISBN 9780030177262.
- Jong, Erica (1980). Fanny: Being the True History of the Adventures of Fanny Hackabout-Jones: A Novel. New York: New American Library. ISBN 9780453003827. "a retelling of Fanny Hill"
- Jong, Erica (1984). Megan's Book of Divorce: A Kid's Book for Adults. Illustrated by Freya Tanz. London: Granada. ISBN 9780246125316.
- Jong, Erica (1996). Megan's Two Houses: A Story of Adjustment. illustrated by Freya Tanz. USA: Dove Kids. ISBN 9780787104054.
- Jong, Erica (1984). Parachutes & Kisses. New York: New American Library. ISBN 978-0451138774. (UK ed. as Parachutes and Kisses: London: Granada, 1984.)
- Jong, Erica (1987). Shylock's Daughter: A Novel of Love in Venice. W. W. Norton & Company. ISBN 978-0393324921.: formerly titled Serenissima
- Jong, Erica (1990). Any Woman's Blues. Chatto & Windus. ISBN 978-0701136727.
- Jong, Erica (1997). Inventing Memory: A Novel of Mothers and Daughters. Tarcherperigree. ISBN 978-1585425846.
- Jong, Erica (2003). Sappho's Leap. W. W. Norton & Co. ISBN 978-0393057614.
- Jong, Erica (2015). Fear of Dying. Griffin. ISBN 978-1250065926.

=== Nonfiction ===
- Jong, Erica (1981). Witches. Illustrated by Joseph A. Smith. New York: Harry N Abrams, Inc. ISBN 9780810917651.
- Jong, Erica (1993). The Devil at Large: Erica Jong on Henry Miller. Random House, Inc. ISBN 978-0394584980.
- Jong, Erica (1994). Fear of Fifty: A Midlife Memoir. HarperCollins. ISBN 978-0060177393.
- Jong, Erica (1998). What Do Women Want? Bread, Roses, Sex, Power. Bloomsbury Publishing PLC. ISBN 978-0747547990.
- Jong, Erica (2006). Seducing the Demon: Writing for My Life. Tarcher. ISBN 978-1585425143.
- Jong, Erica (2007). "My Dirty Secret". In Sussman, Ellen (ed.). Bad Girls: 26 Writers Misbehave. W. W. Norton & Company. ISBN 978-0393331950.
- Jong, Erica (March 28, 2008). "It Was Eight Years Ago Today (But It Seems Like Eighty)". The Huffington Post.

=== Anthology ===
- Jong, Erica, ed. (2011). Sugar in My Bowl: Real Women Write About Real Sex. Ecco. ISBN 978-0062092205.

=== Poetry ===
- Jong, Erica (1973). Half-Lives. Martin Secker & Warburg Ltd. ISBN 978-0436224430.
- Jong, Erica (1975). Loveroot. Henry Holt & Co. ISBN 978-0030140464.
- Jong, Erica (1979). At the Edge of the Body. New York: Holt, Rinehart & Winston. ISBN 978-0030448812.
- Jong, Erica (1983). Ordinary Miracles. New Amer Library. ISBN 978-0452254367.
- Jong, Erica (1991). Becoming Light: New and Selected. Harper Paperbacks. ISBN 978-0060984205.
- Jong, Erica (1997) [1971]. Fruits & Vegetables: Poems. Ecco Pr. ISBN 978-0880015691.
- Jong, Erica (2009). Love Comes First. Tarcherperigree. ISBN 978-1585426843.
- Jong, Erica (2019). The World Began with Yes. Red Hen Press. ISBN 978-1597098465.

== Awards ==
- Poetry Magazine's Bess Hokin Prize (1971)
- Sigmund Freud Award For Literature (1975)
- United Nations Award For Excellence In Literature (1998)
- Deauville Award For Literary Excellence In France
- Fernanda Pivano Award For American Literature In Italy

== Documentary ==
- 2023 Erica Jong - Breaking the Wall by Kaspar Kasics
