= 2024 Virginia Democratic presidential primary =

Presidential electoral process in Virginia

- March 5, 2024

119 delegates (99 pledged, 20 unpledged) to the Democratic National Convention

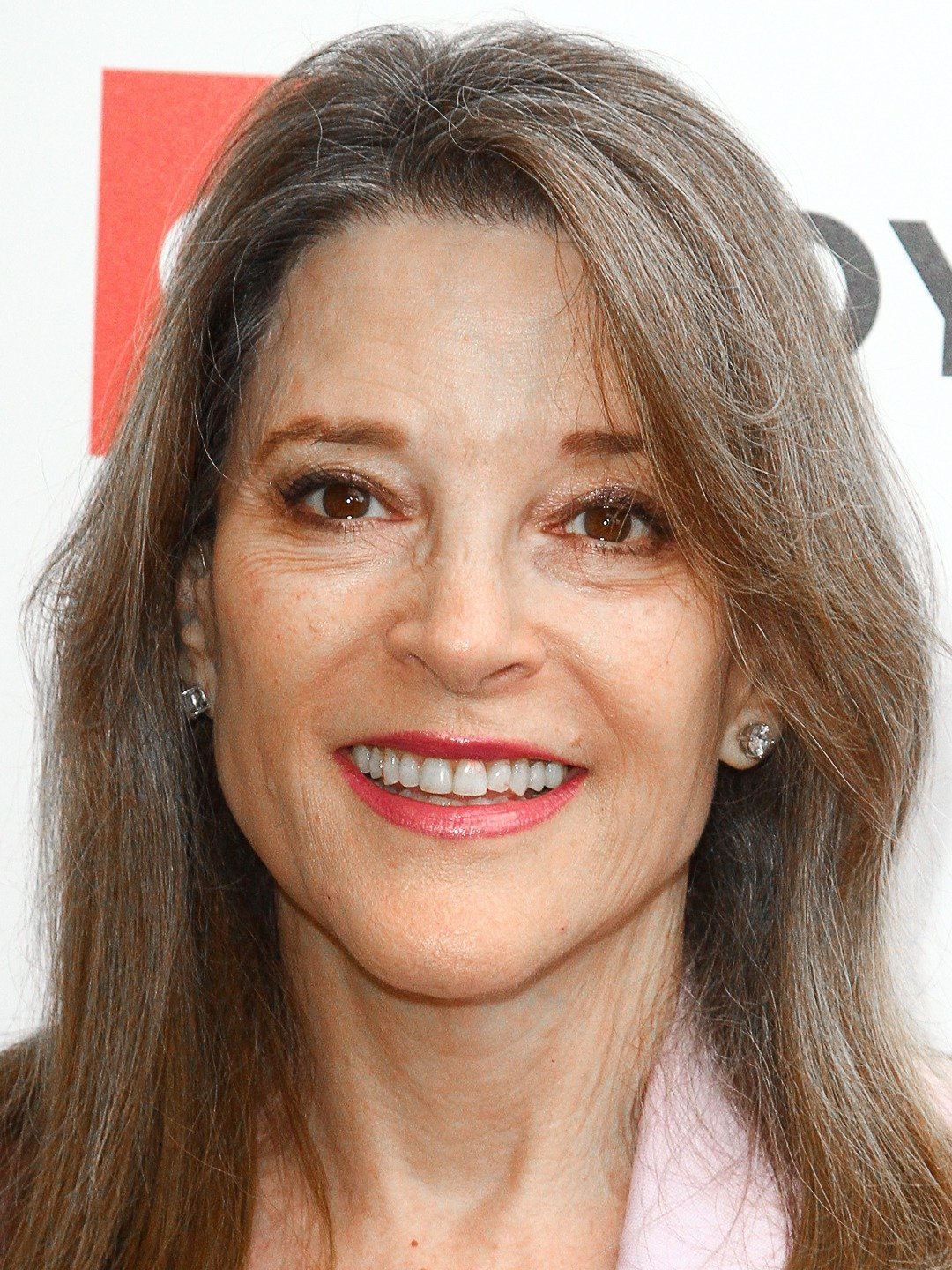
| Candidate | Joe Biden | Marianne Williamson |
| Home state | Delaware | Washington, D.C. |
| Delegate count | 99 | 0 |
| Popular vote | 317,329 | 28,599 |
| Percentage | 88.5% | 8.0% |

Biden
70–80%
80–90%
>90%

The 2024 Virginia Democratic presidential primary took place on March 5, 2024, as part of the Democratic Party primaries for the 2024 presidential election. 99 delegates to the Democratic National Convention were allocated, with 20 additional unpledged delegates. The open primary was held on Super Tuesday alongside primaries in 14 other states and territories.

President Joe Biden won the primary and all delegates with some opposition from Marianne Williamson. Because there was no option for uncommitted delegates in the primary, Gaza war protest vote organizers rallied around Williamson.

== Candidates ==
Incumbent President Joe Biden announced on April 25, 2023, his bid for a second term. He faced a primary challenge from 2020 presidential candidate Marianne Williamson and U.S. Representative Dean Phillips.

== Endorsements ==
Joe Biden

U.S. Senators

- Tim Kaine, U.S. Senator from Virginia (2013–present), 70th Governor of Virginia (2006–2010), 38th Lieutenant Governor of Virginia (2002–2006), Democratic nominee for vice president in 2016

U.S. Representatives

- Jennifer McClellan, U.S. Representative from VA-04 (2023–present)

Mayors

- Levar Stoney, 80th Mayor of Richmond (2017–2025)

== Results ==
Virginia Democratic pres. primary
| Candidate | Votes | % | Delegates |
|---|---|---|---|
| Joe Biden (incumbent) | 317,329 | 88.51 | 99 |
| Marianne Williamson | 28,599 | 7.98 | 0 |
| Dean Phillips | 12,586 | 3.51 | 0 |
| Total | 358,514 | 100% | 99 |

=== Results by congressional district ===
Biden won all 11 of Virginia's congressional districts.

| District | Biden | Williamson | Phillips |
|---|---|---|---|
| 1st | 89.2% | 7.2% | 3.6% |
| 2nd | 91.3% | 5.5% | 3.2% |
| 3rd | 91.9% | 5.4% | 2.7% |
| 4th | 89.2% | 8.1% | 2.7% |
| 5th | 90.3% | 6.5% | 3.2% |
| 6th | 87.6% | 8.3% | 4.1% |
| 7th | 88.1% | 8.1% | 3.8% |
| 8th | 89.1% | 7.4% | 3.5% |
| 9th | 88.4% | 7.2% | 4.4% |
| 10th | 84.2% | 11.4% | 4.4% |
| 11th | 85.3% | 10.8% | 3.9% |
Source: "Presidential Primary Results by Congressional District". The Virginia Public Access Project.

== See also ==
- 2024 Democratic Party presidential primaries
- 2024 Virginia Republican presidential primary
- 2024 United States presidential election
- 2024 United States presidential election in Virginia
- 2024 Virginia elections
- 2024 United States elections
