= Molly Jong-Fast =

American author and pundit (born 1978)

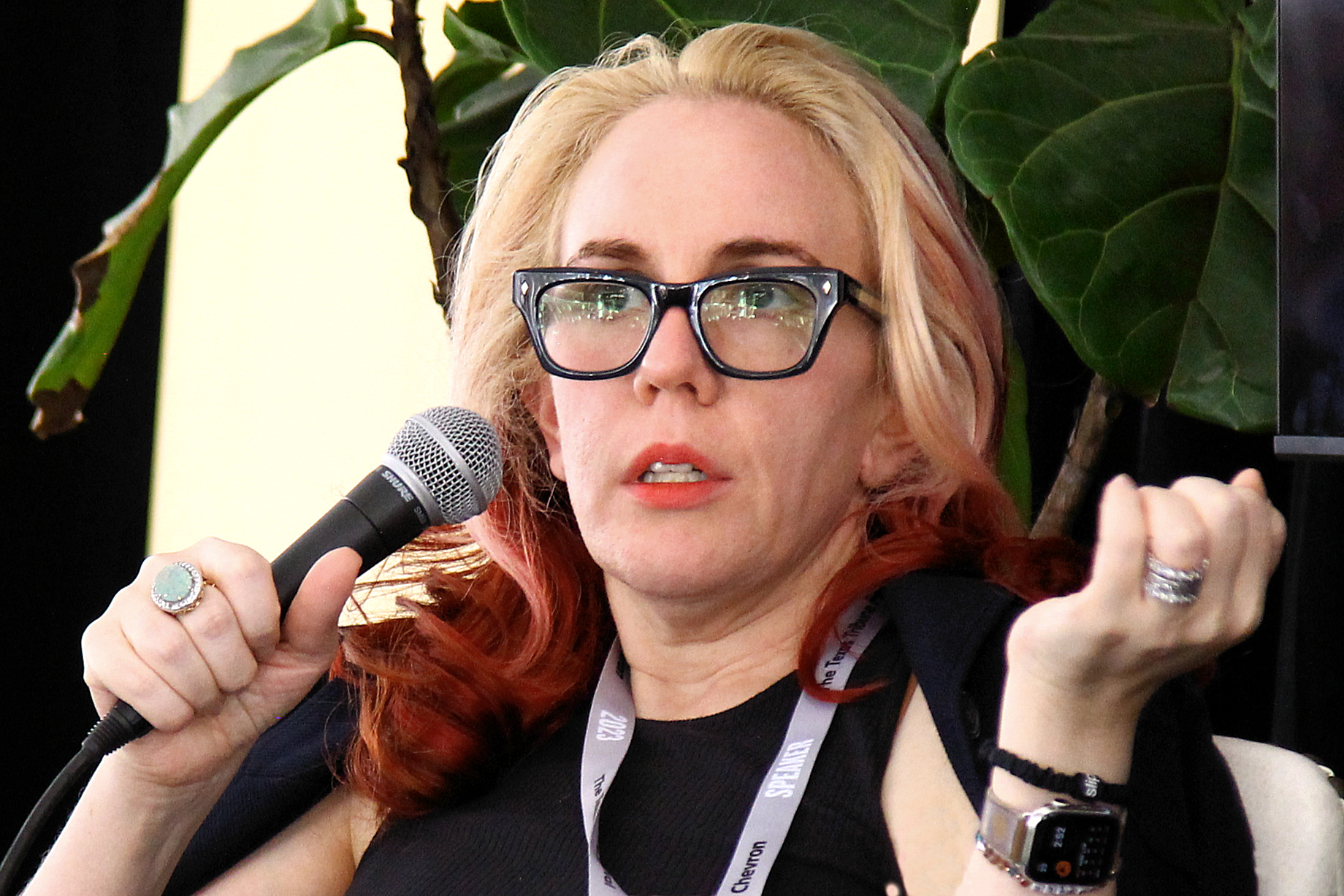
- Jong-Fast in 2023
- Born: August 1978 (age 48); Stamford, Connecticut, U.S.
- Education: Bennington College (MFA)
- Occupations: Journalist; novelist; political commentator
- Spouse: Matthew Greenfield (m. 2003)
- Children: 3
- Parents: Erica Jong; Jonathan Fast
- Relatives: Howard Fast (grandfather); Peter Daou (cousin)

Molly Jong-Fast (born 1978) is an American journalist, novelist, and political commentator.

== Early life and education ==
Jong-Fast was born in August 1978 in Stamford, Connecticut, to novelist Erica Jong and author Jonathan Fast. She is the granddaughter of writer Howard Fast. Her parents divorced during her childhood, and she was raised an only child in Manhattan, by a nanny whom Jong-Fast says essentially raised her as Catholic. Her family is Jewish.

Jong-Fast struggled with substance abuse as a teenager, spending a month in a drug rehabilitation facility at age 19. She graduated from the Riverdale Country School and later attended Wesleyan University, Barnard College, and New York University, but did not graduate. She obtained a Master of Fine Arts degree from Bennington College in 2004.

== Career ==
Jong-Fast is the author of two novels, Normal Girl and The Social Climber's Handbook, and three memoirs, Girl [Maladjusted], The Sex Doctors in the Basement, and How to Lose Your Mother.

After the 2016 U.S. presidential election, Jong-Fast began focusing her writing on politics, becoming a prominent left-wing political commentator during the first presidency of Donald Trump. She became a regular contributor to The Forward, The Bulwark, Playboy, Glamour, and Vogue. She has written for The New York Times, W, Cosmopolitan, Mademoiselle, Marie Claire, the Times of London, Elle, Modern Bride, and The Forward.

In December 2019, Jong-Fast became an editor-at-large at The Daily Beast, hosting the podcast The New Abnormal. In November 2021, she became a contributing writer at The Atlantic, and the writer of its Wait, What? newsletter. In 2022, she joined Vanity Fair as a special correspondent and began hosting the Fast Politics iHeartMedia podcast. In January 2024, she joined MSNBC as a political analyst.

In 2025, Viking Books published Jong-Fast's third memoir, How to Lose Your Mother, which became a New York Times Bestseller within three weeks. A reviewer for The New York Times describes the book as "read[ing] like a score-settling marathon at times, but also like a loving elegy". Novelist Martha McPhee wrote for The Washington Post that How to Lose Your Mother was a "transformative work of alchemy" with "lines so good you won't just want to underline them, you will want to cut them out to share". Oprah Magazine called How to Lose Your Mother "hilarious and heartbreaking" and "the story of a singular mother-daughter relationship that will resonate with anyone who grew up playing second fiddle to a parent's passions."

=== Selected publications ===
- Normal Girl (2000); ISBN 0-37-575759-7
- The Sex Doctors in the Basement: True Stories from a Semi-Celebrity Childhood (2005); ISBN 1-40-006144-X
- Girl [Maladjusted]: True Stories from a Semi-Celebrity Childhood (2006); ISBN 0-81-297074-8
- The Social Climber's Handbook: A novel (2011); ISBN 0-34-550189-6
- How to Lose Your Mother: A Daughter's Memoir. New York: Viking. 2025. ISBN 978-0-593-65647-1.

== Personal life ==
In 2003, Jong-Fast married College of Staten Island English professor Matthew Adlai Greenfield. They have three children. She has written about her experience with Alcoholics Anonymous.

Jong-Fast is a cousin of Lebanese-American political strategist Peter Daou. As of 2007, she lived on the Upper East Side of New York City with her family.
