= Harvey J. Kaye =

American historian (born 1949)

Harvey J. Kaye (born October 9, 1949) is an American historian. He has written and edited over a dozen books, many of which focus on the radical tradition in American history and thought.

== Education ==
Kaye received a B.A. at Rutgers University in 1971. During his undergraduate years, he participated in a six-month study abroad program at the National University of Mexico. He then won a scholarship to the London School of Economics and Political Science within the University of London. He majored in International Relations and Latin American Studies, and earned his M.A. in 1973. He returned to the United States to complete his Ph.D. at Louisiana State University in 1976.

== Career ==
Kaye's first book, The British Marxist Historians, was published in 1984 (it was reissued in 2022). In it he analyzes the writings of Maurice Dobb, Rodney Hilton, Christopher Hill, Eric Hobsbawm, and E.P. Thompson. Kaye then edited anthologies of the works of two other British leftist historians, George Rudé and Victor Kiernan. Kaye's 1992 volume, The Education of Desire: Marxists and the Writing of History, won the Deutscher Memorial Prize.

Next, he shifted focus to America's progressive and radical roots, with two books on the author of Common Sense, specifically, Thomas Paine: Firebrand of the Revolution (2000) and Thomas Paine and the Promise of America (2005). He later wrote about the era of President Franklin Delano Roosevelt in The Fight for the Four Freedoms (2014) and FDR on Democracy (2020).

Kaye has appeared as a commentator on current affairs programs such as Bill Moyers Journal, Moyers & Company, The Thom Hartmann Program, The Hill's Rising web series, The Majority Report with Sam Seder, and That's Jacqueline! Life & Politics Gloves Off. Kaye was a frequent guest on the listener-supported podcast, The David Feldman Show as well as The Michael Brooks Show, with the late Michael Brooks citing Kaye as one of his three primary mentors, along with Adolph L. Reed Jr. and Richard D. Wolff

Kaye has taught many years at the University of Wisconsin–Green Bay (UW-Green Bay), where he is the Ben & Joyce Rosenberg Professor Emeritus of Democracy and Justice Studies. He is also the Founding Director of the University's Center for History and Social Change. His 2015 commencement address at UW-Green Bay was covered in the news. He hosts the Harvey J. Kaye State of Democracy Speaker Series at the university, which has invited speakers such as Democratic Party presidential candidate Marianne Williamson. Kaye served as an advisor to Williamson's 2024 presidential campaign.

Kaye was an Organization of American Historians Distinguished Lecturer (2007-2013), and was a member of The Nation magazine's 2014 Progressive Honor Roll.

== Personal life ==
Kaye was born in Englewood, New Jersey. He and his wife Lorna live in Green Bay, Wisconsin.

== Bibliography ==
=== Books ===
- The British Marxist Historians: An Introductory Analysis, 1984, ISBN 0745600158
- The Face of the Crowd : Studies in Revolution, Ideology, and Popular Protest: Selected Essays of George Rudé (editor), 1988, ISBN 978-0391035898
- History, Classes, and Nation-States: Selected Writings of Victor Kiernan (editor), 1988, ISBN 978-0745604244
- E.P. Thompson: Critical Perspectives (co-edited with Keith McClelland), 1990, ISBN 978-0877227304
- Poets, Politics and the People (editor), 1990, ISBN 978-0860912453
- The Powers of the Past: Reflections on the Crisis and the Promise of History, 1991, ISBN 978-0816621200
- The Education of Desire: Marxists and the Writing of History, 1992, ISBN 978-0415905879
- Imperialism and Its Contradictions (editor), 1995, ISBN 978-0415907972
- "Why Do Ruling Classes Fear History" and Other Questions, 1996, ISBN 978-0312126919
- The Spitting Image: Myth, Memory, and the Legacy of Vietnam (consulting editor), 1998, ISBN 978-0814751466
- Thomas Paine: Firebrand of the Revolution (young adult biography), 2000, ISBN 978-0195116274
- Revolutionary Europe: 1783–1815 (editor), 2000, ISBN 978-0631221890
- Are We Good Citizens?: Affairs Political, Literary, and Academic, 2001, ISBN 978-0807740200
- Thomas Paine and the Promise of America, 2005, ISBN 978-0809089703
- Liberty Tree: Ordinary People and the American Revolution (consulting editor), 2006, ISBN 978-0814796856
- The Fight for the Four Freedoms: What Made FDR and the Greatest Generation Truly Great, 2014, ISBN 978-1451691436
- The American Radical (co-edited with Mary Jo Buhle and Paul Buhle), 2017, ISBN 978-1138402423
- Take Hold of Our History: Make America Radical Again, 2019, ISBN 978-1789043556
- FDR on Democracy: The Greatest Speeches and Writings of President Franklin Delano Roosevelt, 2020, ISBN 978-1510752160

=== Selected articles ===
- "History and Social Theory: Notes on the Contribution of British Marxist Historiography to Our Understanding of Class". Canadian Review of Sociology and Anthropology. 20 (2): 167–192. May 1983.
- "Historical Consciousness and Storytelling: John Berger's Fiction". Mosaic: An Interdisciplinary Critical Journal. 16 (4): 43–57. Fall 1983. JSTOR 24777713.
- "Review: The Making of American Memory". American Quarterly. 46 (2): 251–259. June 1994. JSTOR 2713340.
- "Radicals and the Making of American Democracy: Toward a New Narrative of American History". The History Teacher. 28 (2): 217–225. February 1995. JSTOR 494487.
- "Why Do Ruling Classes Fear History?". World Affairs: The Journal of International Issues. 4 (1): 33–41. June 1995. JSTOR 45064258.
- "Remembering Franklin Delano Roosevelt and the Second Bill of Rights". BillMoyers.com. March 7, 2014.
- "Time for Radical Action, Not National Therapy". BillMoyers.com. May 3, 2016.
