= The Daou =

US musical group

- Origin: New York, United States
- Years active: 1992-1994
- Past members: Peter Daou; Vanessa Daou; Mike Caro; Leon Dorsey; Anthony Johnson

The Daou were an American dance music quintet composed of Peter Daou (keyboards), Vanessa Daou (vocals), Mike Caro (guitar), Leon Dorsey (bass), and former 24-7 Spyz member Anthony Johnson (drums). Their only album Head Music was released in 1992, with its debut single "Surrender Yourself" rising to number one on the U.S. Hot Dance Club Play chart, where it remained for 11 weeks.

Creative disagreements with record label Columbia would see the Daou negotiate out of their contract and subsequently release Head Music's next two singles for the independent Tribal Records. The group disbanded before the release of a second project, and Vanessa Daou would reemerge as a solo act with 1994's Peter Daou-produced Zipless.

== Discography ==
Head Music, album Columbia 1992

Singles

- "Surrender Yourself"
- "Give Myself To You"
- "Are You Satisfied?"
- "Sympathy Bouquet"

== See also ==
- List of number-one dance hits (United States)
- List of artists who reached number one on the US Dance chart
