= Zipless =

Studio album by Vanessa Daou
- Released: 1994
- Genre: Spoken word; ambient
- Length: 40:59
- Label: MCA
- Producer: Peter Daou

Vanessa Daou chronology
Head Music (1992)	Zipless (1994)	Slow to Burn (1996)

Zipless is the first solo album by singer Vanessa Daou, released in 1994. In 2003, Slant Magazine included the album on its list of 50 Essential Pop Albums.

Professional ratings
Review scores
Source	Rating
AllMusic	4.5/5 stars
Muzik	4/5 stars
Slant Magazine	4.5/5 stars

== Track listing ==
1. "The Long Tunnel of Wanting You"
2. "Dear Anne Sexton"
3. "Alcestis on the Poetry Circuit"
4. "Sunday Afternoons" - single
5. "Autumn Perspective"
6. "Near The Black Forest" - single
7. "My Love Is too Much"
8. "Becoming a Nun"
9. "Smoke"
10. "Autumn Reprise"
