= Surrender Yourself =

Single by The Daou

from the album Head Music
- Released: 1992
- Recorded: 1992
- Genre: House
- Length: 4:20 (Album version)
- Label: Columbia
- Songwriter(s): The Daou
- Producer(s): The Daou (Peter Daou and Vanessa "Vandal" Daou)

The Daou singles chronology
"Surrender Yourself" (1992)	"Give Myself To You" (1993)

"Surrender Yourself" is a 1992 debut single by the American electronica dance duo The Daou, which they both co-produced, wrote, and performed the musical arraignments on, most notably on the keyboards, as performed by Peter Daou. Taken from their debut album, Head Music, the single reached number one on the Billboard Hot Dance Club Play chart on July 11, 1992.

== Track listings ==
12 inch single (US)

1. "Surrender Yourself" (Ballroom Mix, remixed by Danny Tenaglia) - 13:30
2. "Surrender Yourself" (Shocking Pink Mix) - 6:00
3. "Surrender Yourself" (Ballroom Re-United) - 3:50
4. "Surrender Yourself" - 4:20

CD Maxi (UK/Europe)

1. "Surrender Yourself" (Ballroom Revisited) - 3:50
2. "Surrender Yourself" (Ballroom Mix) - 13:30
3. "Surrender Yourself" (Shocking Pink Mix) - 6:00
4. "Surrender Yourself" - 4:20
