= Dennis Kucinich 2004 presidential campaign =

American political campaign

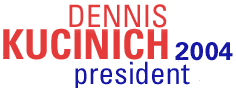
- Campaign: 2004 United States presidential election (Democratic Party primaries)
- Candidate: Dennis Kucinich; House Representative of Ohio (1997–2013); Mayor of Cleveland (1977–1979)
- Affiliation: Democratic Party
- EC formed: February 19, 2003
- Announced: October 13, 2003
- Suspended: July 22, 2004

Website
- http://www.kucinich.us/

A banner outside the entrance of a campaign stop.

The 2004 presidential campaign of Dennis Kucinich, U.S. Representative for Ohio's 10th congressional district and former mayor of Cleveland, began in February 2003, with a formal announcement made in June. Ralph Nader praised Dennis Kucinich as "a genuine progressive", and most Greens were friendly to Kucinich's campaign, some going so far as to indicate that they would not have run against him had he won the Democratic nomination. However, Kucinich was unable to carry any states in the 2004 Democratic Primaries, and John Kerry eventually won the Democratic nomination at the Democratic National Convention.

== Press coverage ==
Kucinich was criticized early in his 2004 campaign for changing his stance on the issue of abortion. His explanation was "I've always worked to make abortions less necessary, through sex education and birth control. But the direction that Congress has taken, increasingly, is to make it impossible for women to be able to have an abortion if they need to protect their health. So when I saw the direction taken, it finally came to the point where I understood that women will not be truly free unless they have the right to choose."

On December 10, 2003, the American Broadcasting Company (ABC) announced the removal of its correspondents from the campaigns of Kucinich, Carol Moseley Braun and Al Sharpton.

The announcement came one day after a Democratic presidential debate hosted by ABC News' Ted Koppel, in which Koppel asked whether the candidacies of Kucinich, Moseley Braun and Sharpton were merely "vanity campaigns," and Koppel and Kucinich exchanged uncomfortable dialogue.

Kucinich, previously critical of the limited coverage given his campaign, characterized ABC's decision as an example of media companies' power to shape campaigns by choosing which candidates to cover and questioned its timing, coming immediately after the debate.

ABC News, while stating its commitment to give coverage to a wide range of candidates, argued that focusing more of its "finite resources" on those candidates most likely to win would best serve the public debate.

== Polls and primaries ==
An anti war activist's car with bumper stickers for Dennis Kucinich, Howard Dean, and Al Gore with Joe Lieberman, a pro war democrat, crossed out.

In the 2004 Democratic presidential nomination race, national polls consistently showed Kucinich's support in single digits, but rising, especially as Howard Dean lost some support among peace activists for refusing to commit to cutting the Pentagon budget. Though he was not viewed as a viable contender by most, there were differing polls on Kucinich's popularity. He placed second in MoveOn.org's primary, behind Dean. He also placed first in other polls, particularly Internet-based ones. This led many activists to believe that his showing in the primaries might be better than what Gallup polls had been saying. However, in the non-binding Washington, D.C. primary, Kucinich finished fourth (last out of candidates listed on the ballot), with only eight percent of the vote. Support for Kucinich was most prevalent in the caucuses around the country.

In the Iowa caucuses he finished fifth, receiving about one percent of the state delegates from Iowa; far below the 15 percent threshold for receiving national delegates. He performed similarly in the New Hampshire primary, placing sixth among the seven candidates with 1 percent of the vote. In the Mini-Tuesday primaries Kucinich finished near the bottom in most states, with his best performance in New Mexico where he received less than six percent of the vote, and still no delegates. Kucinich's best showing in any Democratic contest was in the February 24 Hawaii caucus, in which he won 31 percent of caucus participants, coming in second place to Senator John Kerry of Massachusetts and winning Maui County, one of the four counties won by Kucinich in either of his presidential campaigns (the other three were in the North Carolina 2004 Democratic caucus). He also saw a double-digit showing in Maine on February 8, where he got 16 percent in that state's caucus.

On Super Tuesday, March 2, Kucinich gained another strong showing with the Minnesota caucus, where 17 percent of the ballots went to him. In his home state of Ohio, he gained nine percent in the primary.

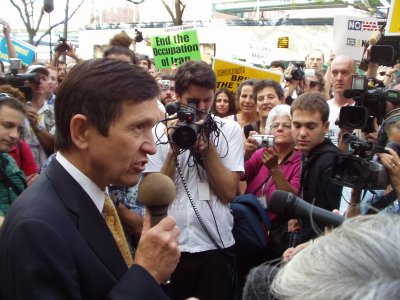
Kucinich speaks out against the occupation of Iraq at the 2004 Democratic National Convention.

Kucinich campaigned heavily in Oregon, spending thirty days there during the two months leading up to the state's May 18 primary. He continued his campaign because "the future direction of the Democratic Party has not yet been determined" and chose to focus on Oregon "because of its progressive tradition and its pioneering spirit." He won 16 percent of the vote.

Even after Kerry won enough delegates to secure the nomination, Kucinich continued to campaign up until just before the convention, citing an effort to help shape the agenda of the Democratic Party. He was the last candidate to end his campaign. He endorsed Kerry on July 22, four days before the start of the Democratic National Convention.
