= Howard Fast: Life and Literature in the Left Lane =

2012 biography Howard Fast

- Author: Gerald Sorin
- Series: The Modern Jewish Experience
- Subject: Howard Fast
- Genre: Biography
- Publisher: Indiana University Press
- Publication date: November 2012
- Media type: Print (hardcover), e-book
- Pages: 528
- Awards: The National Jewish Book Award for Biography (2012)
- ISBN: 978-0-253-00727-8 (hardcover)
- OCLC: 794365488

Howard Fast: Life and Literature in the Left Lane is a biography of the American novelist Howard Fast (1914–2003) written by the historian Gerald Sorin and published by Indiana University Press in 2012 as part of its The Modern Jewish Experience series. Sorin traces Fast's life from his impoverished childhood in immigrant New York through his prolific career as a writer of historical fiction, his fourteen years as a member of the Communist Party of the United States (1943–1957), his imprisonment and blacklisting during the Cold War, and his later commercial success with novels such as The Immigrants series. Using private correspondence, FBI files, unpublished manuscripts, and interviews with Fast's family, Sorin's central interpretive argument is that Fast's decision to join the Communist Party was driven as much by his "fierce desire for fame, fortune and friends," as it was by the secular Jewish tradition of tikkun olam — repairing the world — and a genuine commitment to social justice. The book won the National Jewish Book Award for Biography in 2012 and an Independent Publisher Book Awards silver medal in 2013.

== Background ==
Sorin said that he first encountered Fast's writing as an adolescent in a Brooklyn Jewish neighborhood. He was introduced to it by an older cousin. He said Fast had taught him "a lot, nothing of which I was being taught at school," and mentioned The Last Frontier as one of the most thrilling pieces of literature of his youth. Sorin attributed the project to a long-standing interest in Fast combined with what he described as discomfort that an admired author had remained in the Communist Party USA for fourteen years.

== Synopsis ==
The biography starts with Fast's origins in Jewish immigrant poverty in upper Manhattan, where he was born in 1914 to Barnett and Ida Fast. His mother died when he was eight. His father, a wrought-iron worker, was largely absent. Fast and his older brother Jerome scavenged and worked through their childhood. Sorin considers this period as the formative source of a lifelong appetite for recognition. After two unsuccessful sentimental novels in the early 1930s, Fast turned to historical fiction with Conceived in Liberty (1939) and The Last Frontier (1941), the latter a treatment of the Northern Cheyenne Exodus that the New York Herald Tribune said marked him as "the next really important American historical novelist."

Sorin tracks Fast's political turn through his wartime work at the Office of War Information and a 1943 trip to Hollywood, where he encountered the lavish lives of Communist screenwriters such as John Howard Lawson. Fast joined the Communist Party USA in late 1943. Sorin's central interpretive argument is that the decision was driven less by ideology than by Fast's "fierce desire for fame, fortune, and friends," with the secular Jewish tradition of repairing the world and a genuine commitment to social justice present but secondary. He also documents the long roster of committees and campaigns Fast joined and the personal risks he ran for the cause, including a contempt of Congress conviction stemming from his refusal to surrender the account books of the Joint Anti-Fascist Refugee Committee, a three-month sentence at Mill Point Federal Prison in 1950, and his role as master of ceremonies at the Paul Robeson concert attacked by anti-Communist mobs at the Peekskill riots of 1949.

Fast wrote Citizen Tom Paine (1943) and Freedom Road (1944), his two early bestsellers, as his Party responsibilities grew. Freedom Road, a novel about a formerly enslaved man who becomes a congressman during Reconstruction, drew on W. E. B. Du Bois's scholarship and sold millions of copies in more than eighty languages. Sorin argues that the Party years flattened Fast's fiction under ideology and lost him readers outside the left. He treats My Glorious Brothers (1948) and Spartacus (1951) as exceptions. His American reputation collapsed. The Soviet Union reprinted his books in the hundreds of thousands, made him required reading in Russian schools, and awarded him the Stalin Peace Prize in 1953.

Fast knew by 1949, after a private confrontation in Paris with the Soviet writer Alexander Fadeyev, that Jewish cultural life had been suppressed in the Soviet Union. He remained what Sorin calls a "disciplined Party member" for another seven years. Fast left the Party in late 1956, after Khrushchev's secret speech, news of the murders of Soviet Jewish writers, and the Soviet invasion of Hungary. Two memoirs followed: the bitter The Naked God (1957) and the more nostalgic Being Red (1990). Sorin finds both unreliable accounts of the same period.

The final third of the biography covers Fast's "second career." He co-wrote the screenplay for the 1960 film Spartacuswith the blacklisted Dalton Trumbo, helping to break the Hollywood blacklist. Twenty detective novels appeared under the pseudonym E. V. Cunningham. Fast returned to historical fiction with April Morning (1961) and The Hessian (1972). In the late 1970s he began The Immigrants, a six-novel saga of three California families that sold over ten million copies and made him wealthy. Sorin used interviews with Fast's daughter Rachel, his son Jonathan Fast, his granddaughter Molly Jong-Fast, and his second wife Mimi O'Connor. He follows Fast's fifty-seven-year marriage to the painter Bette Cohen, marked by repeated infidelities on both sides, and his late remarriage in 1999. Fast died in 2003 at eighty-eight.

The biography rests throughout on private correspondence, FBI files, unpublished manuscripts, and family interviews. Sorin closes by crediting Fast with "a half-dozen books or more of lasting value": The Last Frontier, Citizen Tom Paine, Freedom Road, April Morning, The Hessian, My Glorious Brothers, and Spartacus. He nonetheless accepts the literary historian Gordon Hutner's judgment that Fast wrote "the literature not [of] the great, but of the pretty good."

== Reception ==
In his review, Alan Wald called the biography "eloquent, lively, bursting with new details, and sensitive to political and social contexts," and praised it as a crossover work that could reach readers beyond the academy. He credited Sorin with being "mercifully free of the classic problem of being too hagiographical about his subject." He warned, though, that the biographer may "bend the stick too far in the other direction." Fast's sexual life was the example: Wald found the material "so juicy and unflattering that it could be read as a biography in the service of character assassination." Wald also challenged Sorin's central thesis that Fast joined the Communist Party for fame, fortune, and friends. He argued that "multiples of greed and loyalty to principles coexist within single personalities" and that Fast took real personal risks for the Communist cause.

Publishers Weekly described the book as "intriguing if dense" and praised it as a window onto mid-twentieth-century leftism and the anticommunist hysteria of the 1940s and 1950s. Sorin did not whitewash Fast, who came in for criticism on his fiction, his doctrinal rigidity, and his blindness to Stalinist brutality, though Fast's personal life was less integrated into the book's larger themes. For the reviewer, Fast's life had much to reveal about the era and the interplay of belief, identity, art, and ambition.

In her review, Bettina Berch summarized Sorin's thesis: Fast was a middling writer whose Communist Party membership and extramarital affairs were both bids for fame. In Sorin's account, Fast submitted to Party discipline, self-censored, and ignored Stalin's antisemitic campaigns to advance his career, choosing "to be a big fish in a little Communist pond" where political correctness trumped literary quality. Berch asked why any writer would treat Party membership as career-enhancing during the McCarthy era. She noted Sorin's frustration with his subject but predicted the book would spark fresh debate on the role of the artist in Cold War America.

In Sorin's portrait, John Marsh wrote, Fast emerged as "perhaps the most prominent postwar literary communist" and "one of the foremost useful idiots of the West." Marsh found Sorin contradictory on Fast: at times the desire to repair the world read as genuine, at others as cover for ambition. In his reading, "damning by faint praise turns to plain old damning," extending to Sorin's hints of hypomania or narcissism in Fast. Sorin disliked his subject, Marsh wrote, which made the thoroughness of the book all the more remarkable.

== Awards ==
- 2012: The National Jewish Book Award for Biography
- 2013: The Independent Publisher Book Awards silver medal
