= Body language (disambiguation) =

Body language is a form of communication.

Body language may also refer to:

== Music ==
- Body Language (band), an American electronic/alternative music group

=== Albums ===
- Body Language (Boney James album), 1999
- Body Language (Jonathan Cain album), 1997
- Body Language (Kylie Minogue album), 2003
- Body Language (Blake Shelton album), 2021.

=== Songs ===
- "Body Language" (Kid Ink song), 2014
- "Body Language" (Queen song), 1982
- "Body Language" (Jesse McCartney song), 2009
- "Body Language" (Heidi Montag song)
- "Body Language", a 1980 song by the Dooleys
- "Body Language", a 1980 song by Parliament from Trombipulation
- "Body Language", a 2004 song by M.A.N.D.Y and Booka Shade
- "Body Language", a 2016 song by Carly Rae Jepsen from Emotion: Side B
- "Body Language", a 2018 song by Doja Cat from Amala
- "Body Language (Intro)", a 2018 song by Kali Uchis from Isolation
- "Body Language (There in the Dark)", a 1988 song by Peter Cetera from One More Story
- "Kehakeel" (Body Language), a 2019 single by Estonian singer Liis Lemsalu

== Television and film ==
- Body Language (1992 film), a thriller film with Heather Locklear
- Body Language (1995 film), a film with Tom Berenger
- Body Language (2011 film), a Dutch dance film
- Body Language (2017 film), a Nigerian thriller
- Body Language (game show), a 1984 game show hosted by Tom Kennedy
- "Body Language" (Ally McBeal), a 1998 television episode
- "Body Language" (The Office), a 2010 episode of The Office (U.S. TV series)

== Literature ==
- Body Language (book) by Allan Pease
- Body Language, a book by Julius Fast
- Body Language (play), a 1990 play by Alan Ayckbourn
