= Redemption =

Redemption may refer to:

== Religion ==
- Redemption (theology), an element of salvation to express deliverance from sin
- Redemptive suffering, a Roman Catholic belief that suffering can partially remit punishment for sins if offered to Jesus
- Pidyon haben, also known as redemption of the first-born, in Judaism

== Politics ==
- Redeemers or Redemption, the establishment of white Democratic, one-party rule in the U.S. South following Reconstruction
- Redemption movement, a debt and tax evasion movement
- Right of redemption, a right to reclaim foreclosed property

== Arts and entertainment ==
=== Films ===
- The Raid: Redemption, 2011 Indonesian action/martial-arts film
- Redemption (1917 film), an American silent drama
- Redemption (1919 film), an Italian silent film directed by Carmine Gallone
- The Redemption (1924 film), an Italian silent film directed by Guglielmo Zorzi
- Redemption (1930 film), a talkie based on a story by Leo Tolstoy produced by MGM starring John Gilbert
- Redemption (1952 film), an Italian drama directed by Piero Caserini
- Redemption (1991 film), a British television film by Malcolm McKay in the anthology series ScreenPlay
- Redemption: The Stan Tookie Williams Story, a 2004 American television movie
- Redemption: For Robbing the Dead, a 2011 American Western film
- Redemption (2012 film), a short documentary nominated for the 85th Academy Awards
- Redemption (2013 film) or Hummingbird, a British action film by Steven Knight
- Redemption (2019 film), a Mozambique crime film directed by Mickey Fonseca
- Redemption (2023 film), a Peruvian drama directed by Miguel Barreda
- The Redemption (2024), an Australian short film starring Shantae Barnes-Cowan
- The Redemption (2025 film), a social thriller drama
- Redemptions (film), a Canadian crime drama

=== Literature ===
- Redemption (Ali novel), 1990, by Tariq Ali
- Redemption (Angel novel), a 2000 novel by Mel Odom
- Redemption (Fast novel), 1999, by Howard Fast
- Redemption (Uris novel), 1995, by Leon Uris
- The Redemption (novel), a 1936 novel by F. J. Thwaites
- The Living Corpse, a Leo Tolstoy play that made its Broadway debut as Redemption
- Redemption: The Myth of Pet Overpopulation and the No Kill Revolution in America, a book by Nathan Winograd

=== Music ===
==== Albums ====
- Redemption (Benzino album), 2003
- Redemption (Chris Volz album), 2007
- Redemption (Dawn Richard album), 2016
- Redemption (Derek Minor album), 2010
- Redemption (Ektomorf album), 2010
- Redemption (GRITS album), 2006
- Redemption (Huey album), 2010
- Redemption (Jay Rock album), 2018
- Redemption (Joe Bonamassa album), 2018
- Redemption (Josh Gracin album), 2011
- Redemption (Redemption album), 2003
- Redemption (Vomitory album), 1999
- Redemption (White Heart album), 1997
- The Redemption (album), by Brooke Hogan, 2009
- Redemption, by Before Their Eyes, 2012
- Redemption, by Useless ID, 2004
- Redemption, an EP by Walls of Jericho, 2008
- Redemption, an EP by Burna Boy, 2016

==== Songs ====
- La rédemption, an oratorio by Charles Gounod
- "Redemption" (Gackt song), 2006
- "Redemption" (Jesse Jagz song), 2013
- "Redemption" (Shadows Fall song), 2007
- "Redemption" (Sigma and Diztortion song), 2015
- "Redemption", by August Burns Red from Messengers
- "Redemption", by the Devil Wears Prada from Dear Love: A Beautiful Discord
- "Redemption", by Drake from Views
- "Redemption", by For Today from Ekklesia
- "Redemption", by Johnny Cash from American Recordings
- "Redemption", by Muse, the third movement of "Exogenesis: Symphony"
- "Redemption", by Switchfoot from The Beautiful Letdown
- "Redemption", from the Rocky II film soundtrack
- "Redemption", by Jars of Clay from Furthermore: From the Studio, from the Stage

==== Performers ====
- Redemption (band), a progressive/heavy metal band

=== Television ===
==== Series and telemovies ====
- Redemption (TV series), a 2022 crime drama series
- 24: Redemption, a 2008 2-hour TV movie bridging the 6th and 7th seasons of the television series 24

==== Episodes or parts ====
- "Chapter 8: Redemption", eighth and final episode of the first season of The Mandalorian (2019)
- "Redemption", the fourteenth episode of the BBC television series Blake's 7
- Redemption, the fifth volume of the television show Heroes, season 4 (2009)
- "Redemption" (Silent Witness), a two-part segment of the TV series Silent Witness, Series 24 (2021)
- "Redemption" (Star Trek: The Next Generation), a two-part episode of Star Trek: The Next Generation (1991)
- "Redemption" (Stargate SG-1), a two-part episode of Stargate SG-1 (2002)

=== Other arts and entertainment ===
- Redemption (card game), a collectible card game based on the Bible
- Impact Wrestling Redemption, a professional wrestling pay-per-view produced by Impact Wrestling

== See also ==
- Redemption song (disambiguation)
- Redemption value, in finance
- Redemptor, a 2021 young adult fantasy novel by Jordan Ifueko
- Redemptoris (disambiguation)
- Redemptorist (disambiguation)
- Redeemer (disambiguation)
