= Cranberry Glades =

Cluster of bogs in West Virginia, US

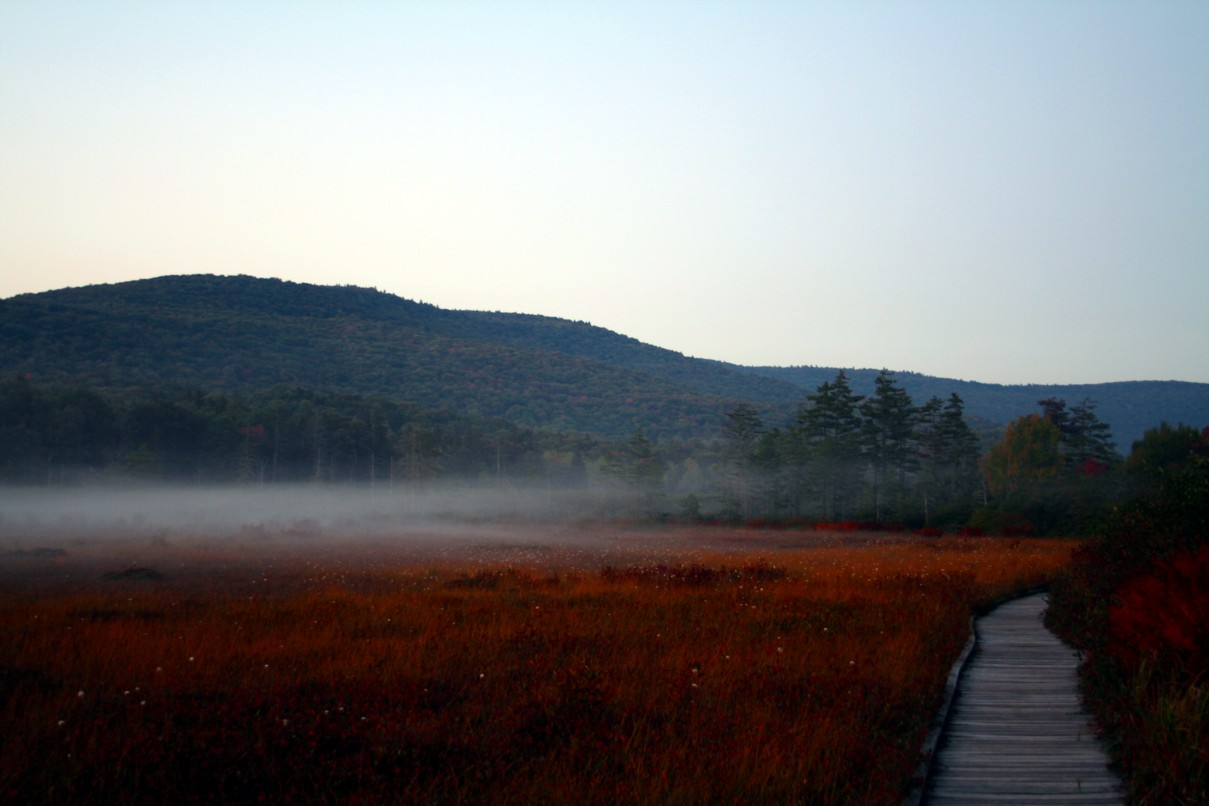
- Fog over Cranberry Glades boardwalk

- Location within West Virginia
- Location: Pocahontas, West Virginia, United States
- Coordinates: 38°12′11″N 80°15′59″W
- Area: 750 acres (300 ha)
- Elevation: 3,400 ft (1,000 m)
- Operator: Monongahela National Forest
- Website: Cranberry Glades Botanical Area

Cranberry Glades—also known simply as The Glades—are a cluster of five small, boreal-type bogs in southwestern Pocahontas County, West Virginia, United States. This area, in the Allegheny Mountains at about 3,400 feet (1,000 m), is protected as the Cranberry Glades Botanical Area, part of the Monongahela National Forest. This site is the headwaters of the Cranberry River, a popular trout stream, and is adjacent to the nearly 50,000-acre (200 km^{2}) Cranberry Wilderness.

The Glades are a 750-acre (3.0 km^{2}) grouping of peat bogs resembling some Canadian bogs. The gladed land is highly acidic and supports plants commonly found at higher latitudes, including cranberries, sphagnum moss, skunk cabbage, and two carnivorous plants (purple pitcher plant and sundew). The Glades serve as the southernmost home of many of the plant species found there.

== History ==
=== Prehistoric and Indigenous Use ===
The Cranberry Glades area is believed to have formed after the last Ice Age, approximately 10,000 years ago, when glacial meltwaters and cool, wet conditions created the acidic, peat-filled wetlands seen today. Although glaciers never directly covered this region, the cooler climate allowed boreal plant species typically found much farther north to thrive.

Archaeological evidence suggests that early indigenous peoples utilized the glades as seasonal hunting and foraging grounds. The nutrient-poor soils and wet conditions likely discouraged permanent settlements, but the area provided an abundance of plant and animal resources. Tribes such as the Shawnee and Cherokee are known to have traversed these lands, leaving behind artifacts that hint at their seasonal presence.

=== European Exploration and Settlement ===
European settlers began exploring the area in the 18th century, drawn by its dense forests and abundant wildlife. By the 19th century, logging operations started targeting the old-growth red spruce and hemlock forests surrounding the glades. The fragile bog ecosystems, however, largely remained untouched due to their unsuitability for farming and timber harvesting.

=== Conservation Efforts ===
The Cranberry Glades were officially designated as a National Natural Landmark in 1974, recognizing their importance as one of the largest high-elevation bogs in the Appalachians. Today, the area continues to be managed as part of the Monongahela National Forest.

== Geography and geology ==
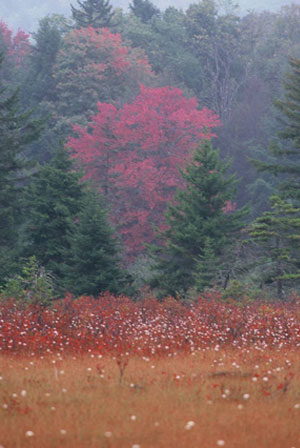
Cranberry Glades

The natural history of the Glades has been traced back at least 12,200 years. Apparently, a forest of conifer-northern hardwoods replaced tundra with the end of the Last Glacial Period. Over time the Glades formed into what it is today. Now, most of the bog is underlain by peat that is up to 10 feet (3.0 m) thick. Under the peat is a layer of algal ooze, underlain by marl. Since a limestone source in the surrounding rocks is indicated, an ample source appears to be present in the underlying Hinton Formation, a circumstance that also has significant implications for the Glades' flora.

The area is not entirely a glade, but a bog or wetland covered with all sorts of decaying vegetation. The peat and decaying organic matter is more than ten feet thick under the dense plant cover. The ground is not as much as quicksand or swampy, but spongy. It is in a high valley, about 3,300 to 3,400 feet (1,000 to 1,000 meters) above sea level, surrounded by the Cranberry, Kennison, and Black Mountains.

Five separate glades were identified and named in 1911: Big Glade (59 acres), Flag Glade (28 acres), Long Glade (20 acres), Round Glade (8 acres) and Little Glade (1 acre). The smallest, Little Glade, has since grown over and is no longer recognizable.

Darlington's studies showed that the Glades were formed by easily eroding rocks in the basin and more resistant rock at its lower end. This effectively prevented down-cutting and maintained a low gradient in the valley. This resulted in an elevation of 3,400 ft (1,000 m) at the upper end and 3,350 ft (1,020 m) at the back, eliminating the possibility of origin by water impoundment.

The water from the Glades drains to form the headwaters of the Cranberry River, a popular trout stream joined by the Yew and Charles Creeks. It starts at about 4,600 feet (1,400 m) elevation, and then it meanders through the glades and recedes through a narrow gap between Kennison and Black Mountains. It then joins the Gauley River 25 miles (40 km) down the mountains at about 1,920 feet (590 m).

== Ecology ==
The Glades have been the subject of much scientific study, especially during the 1930s, 1940s and 1950s. Professor Maurice Brooks conducted studies in 1930, 1934, and 1945. The work of Strausbaugh (1934), Darlington (1943), and Core (1955) followed. In 1974, the Cranberry Glades Botanical Area was designated a National Natural Landmark.

=== Flora ===
Many of the plants found in the Glades resemble those in the northern region of North America. They are descendants of seeds that took root over 10,000 years ago before the last glacial retreat. Among these are two unusual species of carnivorous plants that thrive in the area—the purple pitcher plant and native sundew. They evolved carnivorous habits because of the scarce root food in the spongy soil. Two very rare boreal plants—bog rosemary and buckbean—live in the Big Glade.

Much of the area provides a home for many species of mosses. These include a cover of sphagnum moss, bird-wheat moss, bog moss and reindeer lichen. Hummocks of these plants reach a height of 3 feet (0.91 m). Over top of these grow prostrate cranberry vines that bloom pink flowers in the summer, fruiting in late September.

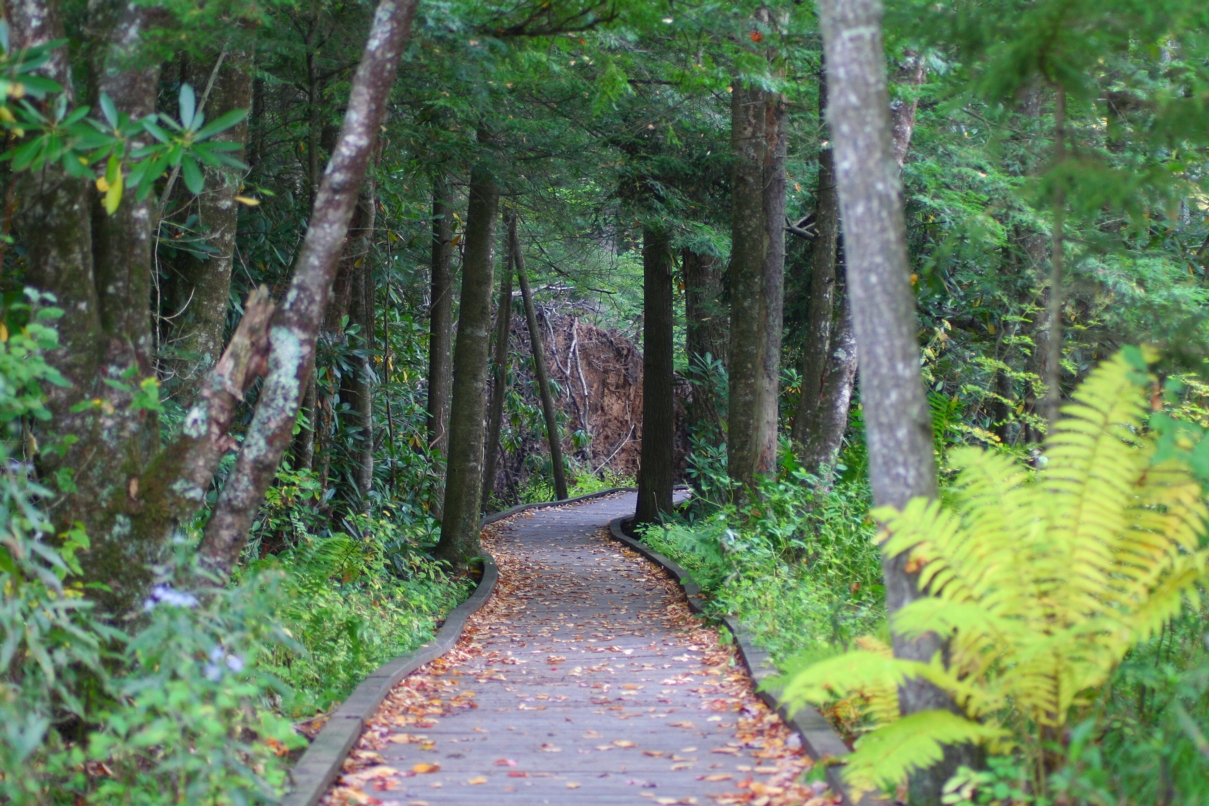
A forest trail.

Most tree species occur in the "bog forest" habitat, which is composed primarily of a mixture of red spruce, eastern (or Canada) hemlock, yellow birch and red maple. The upland forests immediately surrounding the wetlands are dominated by these same species, but also include American beech, sugar maple, black cherry, American basswood, white ash, yellow buckeye, black birch, cucumber tree, Fraser magnolia, and northern red oak.

The shrub layer, unlike the tree layer, is relatively species-rich. This is a consequence of the widespread presence of low- to medium-height woody plants throughout shrub swamps, forest habitats, and open glades. In the fringes of open glades and along streams, the dominant species is usually speckled alder. Also common are willow, pipestem, glade St. Johns-wort, great rhododendron, hobblebush, smooth arrowwood, wild raisin, ninebark, alternate-leaved dogwood, bunchberry, winterberry holly, mountain holly, swamp rose, the Appalachian endemic longstalked holly and many more. Most of these shrubs have markedly northern distributions, and bog rosemary and oblongfruited serviceberry are at their southernmost limits of distribution. The Canada yew is an uncommon evergreen shrub that was historically reported as abundant in the area. Nearby Yew Creek is presumably named for this species, as may be the broader Yew Mountains region in which the Glades are located. Browsing deer have reduced the number of Canada yew to such an extent that it is found only in scattered locations throughout its central Appalachian range.

Many herbs with primarily northern distributions occur here, including oak fern, pod grass, Canada mayflower, mountain bindweed, marsh marigold, goldthread, swamp saxifrage, white wood sorrel, northern white violet, Jacob's ladder and buckbean. Jacob's ladder is at its southernmost location. Grasses and sedges found here include blue joint, drooping wood reed grass, millet grass, rattlesnake mannagrass, interior sedge, and Fraser's sedge. Wild lilies in the Glades include yellow clintonia and white hellebore. Orchids include rose pogonia, lesser rattlesnake plantain, northern coralroot, and grass-pink orchid that are in full bloom in July. Northern (or early) coralroot is probably at its southernmost location in the eastern United States.

=== Fauna ===
Many animals that live in the Glades are at their southernmost breeding grounds, including birds such as the Swainson's and hermit thrushes, Nashville and mourning warblers, and purple finches. Other, less exotic, birds like ravens and hawks are common. Other familiar animals including white-tailed deer inhabit the Glades. Black bears have been seen in the skunk cabbage growing along the boardwalk. In the evening, you have a good chance of hearing beavers working; they are mostly inactive during the day. It is hard to see the beavers because of little light, and they are dark colored. They also reside submerged or are building their homes.

== Weather ==
Like many of the adjoining areas high in the Alleghenies, Cranberry Glades is known for frequent weather changes. Generally speaking, the area is cool and wet, comparable to the climates of New England and Canada. This is due to its high elevation and the surrounding higher mountains forming a bowl, draining their cool air downhill into the Glades. The potential for frost exists year-round at Cranberry Glades. In some years, the frost-free period has been as short as 81 days. Still, the average summer high is in roughly 74–82 °F (23–28 °C). Mid-winter temperatures record as low as −26 °F (−32 °C), and the area often sees heavy snow.

== Popular culture ==
- Cranberry Glades is a location in Fallout 76, as Cranberry Bog.
- Tyler Childers references the Cranberry Glades on "Universal Sound" from his 2017 album Purgatory.

== See also ==
- List of botanical gardens and arboretums in West Virginia
- Cranberry Wilderness
- Mill Point Federal Prison
- List of National Natural Landmarks
- List of National Natural Landmarks in West Virginia
