= Redemption song =

Redemption song(s) may refer to:

== Music ==
- "Redemption Song", a 1972 song from the Toots and the Maytals albums Slatyam Stoot and Funky Kingston
- "Redemption Song", a 1980 song from the Bob Marley album Uprising
- "Redemption Song", a 1989 song from the Majek Fashek album Prisoner of Conscience
- Redemption Songs, a 2005 album by Jars of Clay
- Redemption Songs (Sons of Korah album), a 2000 album by Sons of Korah
- Redemption Songs: Unearthed, Vol. 3, a 2003 album by Johnny Cash
- "You're Not the Only One (Redemption Song)", a 2018 song from the Lukas Graham album 3 (The Purple Album)

== Books ==
- Redemption Song: An Irish Reporter Inside the Obama Campaign, a book about Barack Obama's 2008 presidential election campaign by Niall Stanage
- Redemption Song: The Ballad of Joe Strummer, a 2006 biography of Joe Strummer by Chris Salewicz
- Redemption Song: Muhammad Ali and the Spirit of the Sixties, a 1999 biography of Muhammad Ali by Mike Marqusee

== Television ==
- Redemption Song (TV series), a 2008 American reality show where female contestants compete to become a rockstar
- Redemption Song, an episode from Degrassi: The Next Generation (season 5)

== See also ==
- Redemption (disambiguation) § Songs, for songs titled "Redemption"
