= Gerald Sorin =

Professor of American and Jewish Studies

Gerald Sorin (born October 23, 1940) is a Distinguished Professor of American and Jewish Studies and the Director of the Louis and Mildred Resnick Institute for the Study of Modern Jewish Life at the State University of New York at New Paltz.

== Early life and education ==
Sorin earned a B.A. at Columbia College in 1962, an M.A. at Wayne State University in 1964, and a Ph.D. from Columbia University in 1969.

== Career and publications ==
Sorin started teaching in 1965 at SUNY New Paltz, where he specialized in American social and political history and culture, and taught a wide variety of courses, including several on slavery and the coming of the Civil War. His first two books were The New York Abolitionists: A Case Study in Political Radicalism (1970) and Abolitionism: A New Perspective (1972). In the late 1970s, he pursued Jewish studies as a post-doctoral student at YIVO, the Max Weinreich Institute for Jewish Research. He became the Director of the Jewish Studies Program at SUNY New Paltz in 1983, the Chair of the History Department in 1986, and was the founder of the Louis and Mildred Resnick Institute for the Study of Modern Jewish Life in 1989, which he continues to direct.

He now writes extensively on Jewish themes, focusing primarily on movements for social justice and on post-WWII Jewish American literature. His biography of the New York Intellectual, democratic Socialist, and Yiddishist, Irving Howe: A Life of Passionate Dissent (2002), won the National Jewish Book Award in History in 2003, and was a New York Times “Notable Book” in the same year. Sorin's book on one of America's most prolific and politically controversial writers, Howard Fast: Life and Literature in the Left Lane, was published by Indiana University Press in November 2012.

He has also written collective biographies including, The New York Abolitionists; The Prophetic Minority: American Jewish Immigrant Radicals (1985); and The Nurturing Neighborhood (1990), which focused on the communal values and socialist orientation that influenced Jewish boys growing up in Brownsville, Brooklyn, in the 1940s. This book was followed by A Time for Building: American Jewish Immigration, The Third Migration, 1880-1920, which is part of the acclaimed five-volume series The Jewish People in America, edited by Henry Feingold, and was judged “a thoroughly engaging, carefully researched, and professionally impressive synthesis.”

Sorin's other work includes Tradition Transformed: The Jewish Experience in America (1997) and more than 200 articles, essays, and reviews which have appeared in more than two dozen scholarly journals, and in The Forward, Haaretz, Congress Monthly, Newsday, The Jewish Reader, and JBooks. He has written nine books, several of which and collectively have been critically admired and recognized by honors and awards. In addition to the National Jewish Book Award in History, Sorin received the Saul Viener Prize for the best book in Jewish American History, 2001–2002. He was also the recipient of The Lee Max Friedman Medal, 2006, awarded by the American Jewish Historical Society for a lifetime of outstanding service and scholarly contribution to American Jewish studies. In 2013, his Howard Fast: Life and Literature in the Left Lane (2012) won the National Jewish Book Award in Biography and a silver medal for biography from Independent Publisher Awards (IPPY).

Sorin has also taught American Studies in the Netherlands at the University of Utrecht's School of Journalism in 1992, and at Nijmegen University in 1998 as the Fulbright Association's John Adams Distinguished Chair of American Studies; he continues to serve on the executive board of the American Jewish Historical Society and on the Managing Editorial Board of American Jewish History.

== Awards and honors ==
- National Jewish Book Award in Biography, 2013
- Silver medal for biography from Independent Publisher Awards (IPPY)
- Lee Max Friedman Award Medal, 2006
- National Jewish Book Award in History, 2003
- Saul Viener Prize for Best Book in American Jewish History, 2002-2003
- New York Times, Notable Book, 2003
- Fulbright Scholar Program appointment, 1998

== Publications ==
=== Books ===
- The New York Abolitionists: A Case Study in Political Radicalism (Westport, CT: Greenwood Press, 1970) ISBN 0837133084
- Abolitionism: A New Perspective (New York, Praeger, 1972) ASIN: B002JBQDMM
- The Prophetic Minority: American Jewish Immigrant Radicals, 1880-1920 (Bloomington: Indiana University Press, 1985) ISBN 0253346185
- The Nurturing Neighborhood: The Brownsville Boys Club and Jewish Community in Urban America, 1940-1990 (New York: New York University Press, 1990) ASIN: B004ECGXLU
- The Jewish People in America. A Time for Building: The Third Migration, 1880-1920 (Baltimore: Johns Hopkins University Press, 1992) ISBN 080185122X
- Tradition Transformed: The Jewish Experience in America (1997) ISBN 0801854474
- Irving Howe: A Life of Passionate Dissent (New York: New York University Press, 2002) ISBN 0814740200
- Howard Fast: Life and Literature in the Left Lane (Bloomington: Indiana University Press, 2012) ISBN 0253007275
- Saul Bellow: "I Was a Jew and an American and a Writer" (Bloomington: Indiana University Press, 2024) ISBN 9780253069436

=== Articles ===
- The Civil War Letters of "William Yank," Manuscripts (Summer 1978)
- Black and Jewish Resistance to Depersonalization, Jewish Currents (February 1982)
- American Jewish Socialists and the Psychological Dimensions of Marginality, in The Many Faces of Psychohistory (1984)
- Tradition and Change: American Jewish Socialists as Agents of Acculturation, American Jewish History (Autumn 1989)
- Street-Corner Jews: The Boys of Brownsville, YIVO Annual (1990)
- Mutual Contempt, Mutual Benefit: The Strained Encounter Between German and Eastern European Jews in the United States, American Jewish History (Autumn 1993)
- From the Brownsville Boys Club to the American Jewish Committee: Irving Levine and the Persistence of Jewish Liberalism, in An Inventory of Promises: Essays in *Honor of Moses Rischin, eds. Gurock and Raphael (1995)
- The Triumphs and Travails of a Jewish Woman Labor Organizer: Rose Pesotta in the Far West, Western States Jewish History (January 1996)
- Louis Farrakhan: Problematic Prophet, in Congress Monthly (September/October 1996)
- Jewish Women and Socialism, in Jewish Women in America, eds. Hyman and Moore (1997)
- Cultural Pluralism and Democracy: Roots and Prospects, in The Simmering Stew, eds. Diederik Oostdijk and Mathilde Roza (1998)
- Black Antisemitism on Campus: Political Opportunism and Academic Betrayal, Michael (University of Tel Aviv) (Spring 2000)
- Irving Howe's “Margin of Hope”: World of Our Fathers as Autobiography, American Jewish History (December 2000)
- The Making of a Jewish Liberal Activist: Irving Levine and Brownsville, in The Jews of Brooklyn (2001)
- Irving Howe and Secular Jewishness, Jewish Currents (May–June 2005)
- The Relevance of Irving Howe, in John Rodden, ed. The Worlds of Irving Howe (2006)
