= Blue Heron Press =

Canadian literary press

- Type: Privately held company
- Industry: Books
- Founded: 1952; 74 years ago in New York, United States
- Founder: Howard Fast
- Headquarters: Toronto, Canada
- Website: blueheronpress.ca

Blue Heron Press is a privately held company and literary press currently headquartered in Toronto, Canada.

== History ==
Blue Heron Press was founded in New York City in 1952 by Howard Fast. The name arose as a result of a friend's suggestion it be called the "Red Herring Press", but Fast agreed that "while that was colorful, it did not strike [him] as a fruitful aid to selling books".

Blue Heron Press was a way for Fast to publish his book Spartacus, which at the time was blacklisted. Spartacus became the first book published by the new press.

In 1953, Blue Heron Press published a reprint of W. E. B. Du Bois' The Souls of Black Folk, which was the eighth book published by Blue Heron Press. The suggestion was made by Shirley Graham Du Bois as a 50th anniversary edition, as it had been previously published in 1903 by A. C. McClurg & Company. The 50th anniversary edition (called the Jubilee Edition) contained a new preface by W.E.B. Du Bois that was reprinted in Monthly Review but is largely absent in current prints.
