= Redemptorist (disambiguation) =

Redemptorist is a Catholic clerical religious congregation of pontifical right for men (priests and brothers). It was founded by Alphonsus Liguori at Scala, Italy.

Redemptorist may also refer to:

- Redemptoristines, a female contemplative religious order of the Catholic Church. It was formed in 1731, and is the female counterpart to the Redemptorists
- Redemptorist Church, also Baclaran Church, in Baclaran, Parañaque city of Metro Manila, Philippines
- Redemptorist High School, North Baton Rouge, Louisiana, U.S.
- Redemptorist Monastery, North Perth, Australia
- Redemptorist Monastery, Kinnoull, also St Mary's Monastery, Kinnoull, in Kinnoull, Perth, Scotland
- Redemptorist–Aseana station, a light rail station in Parañaque, Philippines
- Transalpine Redemptorists, former name for Sons of the Most Holy Redeemer, traditionist group formed from the Redemptorists in 2008

== See also ==
- Redemption (disambiguation)
- Redemptoris (disambiguation)
