= The First Men =

Short story by Howard Fast

First publication, cover art by Ed Emshwiller

"The First Men" is a 1960 science fiction short story by American writer Howard Fast. It was first published in The Magazine of Fantasy and Science Fiction in February 1960. It was later printed bundled with "The Martian Shop" (1959) in The Edge of Tomorrow. A full version of the story was also included in The Penguin Science Fiction Omnibus (1973) edited by Brian Aldiss. It is now freely available online.

== Plot introduction ==
Fast's story is about how a group of scientists and educators, through a controlled environment, succeed in raising naturally gifted children into "man-plus"—people who possess comparatively super-human abilities. They possess unparalleled understanding of all technical subjects such as math, physics and unlock natural telepathy. They also excel at physical endeavors, such as sports and break numerous physical records.

Their controlled environment, an isolated compound in California comprising 8,000 acres (32 km^{2}), is a government sponsored facility granted for the raising of the children. The scientists were given fifteen years, later extended by three more years and a few weeks, to experimentally raise the children. By a very early age, the children surpass their teachers' knowledge.

== Plot summary ==
The story begins as a series of communiqués between a sister, Jean Arbalaid, and her brother, Harry Felton, recently retired from the military. Jean and her husband, Mark, are renowned and well-connected psychologists. Since he is unemployed, Jean sends Harry on a series of trips to investigate some extreme cases of feral children. His reports back to her confirm her hypothesis that children are a result of their environment.

Jean and Mark convince the US government to sponsor an experimental program to raise 40 children in a controlled environment, tailored to allow them to reach their full potential. The children in question, all babies when arriving at the government-sponsored compound, are all to be naturally gifted. The compound the government grants them is a secluded 8,000 acres (32 km^{2}) compound in California. The researchers are given 15 years to raise the children.

Next she sends Harry to find a Professor Hans Goldbaum who, before World War II, had written a paper about how he had discovered a set of characteristics in babies that would determine whether or not they would grow to be mentally gifted. Finding him, Goldbaum agrees to join their project and he and Harry set out to find a diverse set of gifted babies (orphans and those they could buy) for the compound.

After delivering the children, Harry has no more involvement with the project.

About eighteen years later, a White House operative, Eggerton, summons Harry and inquires him on his knowledge of the work in the compound. He truthfully tells them that he has no inside knowledge of the project, save what his sister told him in the project's beginnings, which he hadn't disclosed to anyone due to its secrecy.

Harry is told that the compound was about to be visited for the first time since its beginning and, as they were about to enter, promptly vanished. It was replaced by a great, gray impenetrable barrier.

In hearing this, Harry produces a letter he had received almost a year earlier from his sister. In it, they find an informal report on their progress in the experiment.

Jean and Mark had recruited a group of educators, married couples only, to live and teach at the compound. All the educators, Jean and Mark included, acted as teacher/parents to all the children: no one child had one parent, no one teacher had one child.

They then immersed the children in a knowledge-rich atmosphere. Since they were predetermined to be mentally gifted, they all progressed rapidly in knowledge and abilities. By the time they were five, the children were discovering their telepathic abilities.

Jean relates that the children usually walk about nude, openly make love with one another, and possess unmatched knowledge in all academic and physical areas. They also share one mindset. With their advanced telepathic abilities, they constantly think as one, no verbal communication is necessary between them. When meeting with the researchers, who they love, but pity (due to their inferior intelligence and lack of telepathic abilities), only one child is necessary since all can hear and speak through the single representative's mind.

Several children are born to the researchers while living at the facility. While these children are of normal intelligence, they flourish under the tutelage of the older children and become almost as gifted as them.

Near the end of the fifteenth year, realizing that their experiment is about to be investigated, Jean worries what may happen to the children, now young adults, when the government discovers them. The experiment was a success—too much of a success. Not only have they raised mentally gifted people, they have given rise to a new race of super-intelligent demigods. Jean fears—correctly—that the government will react with fear and destroy the advanced super-race. The children, though incredibly advanced, are incapable of violence, even in self-defense.

Jean is able to obtain a three-year extension, and then another of a few weeks when the three years expires. In that time, the children, now able to telepathically reach the entire Earth's population, build a defense mechanism which resulted in the gray barrier Eggerton described. Jean reveals that the barrier is based on time: the Earth outside the shield is a fraction of a millisecond in the future. They can pass outside without any difficulty. And though they can also get back in, Jean doesn't disclose how this is done.

While cut off with the shield, the children are summoning other gifted children telepathically. Passing secretly outside the shield, they are to bring them into the compound to be raised like the others. Hopefully, given time, they would be able to construct more secret compounds to raise more super-intelligent humans. By doing this, perhaps they could turn the tide of humanity. This all depends, of course, on the security provided by their shield.

At the conclusion of the letter, Eggerton says that now that they know the basis of the shield, the "eggheads" will find a way in. And when they do, they'll eradicate "the disease."
