= The Immigrants =

Novel by Howard Fast

- First edition
- Author: Howard Fast
- Cover artist: Ben Stahl
- Genre: Historical novel
- Publisher: Houghton Mifflin
- Publication date: 1977
- Media type: Print
- Pages: 389
- ISBN: 0-395-25699-2
- Followed by: Second Generation (1978)

The Immigrants (1977) is a historical novel written by Howard Fast. Set in San Francisco during the early 20th century, it tells the story of Daniel Lavette, a self-described "roughneck" who rises from the ashes of the 1906 San Francisco earthquake and becomes one of the most successful and dominating figures in San Francisco. The book hit number 5 on New York Times adult best seller list on November 6, 1977.

== Plot summary ==
Born on the voyage to America to his French father and Italian mother, Daniel Lavette grows up helping his father on a fishing boat. Tragedy strikes early one morning, however, when Dan wakes early to prepare the boat. The great San Francisco earthquake destroys vast swathes of the city including the small apartment where his parents were sleeping. Following a traumatic three days spent ferrying passengers across the bay to Oakland, he is taken in by friends of his father. The two immigrant families of Italian and Jewish origin use the money earned from the ferrying to start a financial empire and a bank, the Bank of Sonoma.

Although Dan becomes quite rich, he does not stop. He wants to become a multimillionaire and has many ideas in mind. He is an entrepreneur and seeks to find his place among the rich businessmen on Nob Hill. He asks for a loan from the larger Seldon Bank in San Francisco, but the owner declines. During that meeting, Dan meets Jean, the exquisitely beautiful daughter of the owner, and both are smitten with each other. Soon after, they marry, against the will of Jean's mother, who looks down on immigrants and those of poor pedigree.

Dan grows increasingly wealthy, but his happiness is short-lived. After they have two children, Jean ceases to love him and grows cold to his advances. Dan hires a Chinese bookkeeper, Feng Wo, to assist him at the start of his business dealings, but only receives an invitation for dinner at Wo's house after several years. Because Jean shares her mother's distaste for other ethnicities, Dan attends alone. At the dinner, Dan enjoys the company of Wo's daughter, May Ling, laughing and feeling more at ease than he had since his first days with Jean. After visiting her a few times at the library where she works, Dan falls in love with May Ling. They engage in an affair and they have a child together. So that she may have all of his energies to herself, May Ling wants him to divorce Jean. Dan broaches the idea to Jean, but is flatly declined as divorce is not something the Seldon family participates in. Even after she discovers the affair and has romantic meetings of her own, she will not divorce him and holds onto the marriage as a ploy for leverage.

The empire Dan started with his friend, Mark Levy, of his fishing boats and Levy's goods store, continues to grow. The Levy and Lavette Company (later L&L Shipping) gets into the business of shipping bulk cargo and profit from assisting the Allied cause during World War I. Sensing the end of the war, Dan convinces Mark to sell the cargo ships. Doing so before the cargo market collapses, the company greatly profits and uses the money to start a classy department store. Adding to this, the pair diversify by adding luxury cruise liners and begin building a hotel on Waikiki Beach in Hawaii. They also begin one of the first airlines on the West Coast. Impressed with the raging stock market of the late 1920s, the duo issues shares to list their company on the exchange and begin playing the market on margin. This bubble bursts in the crash of 1929 that begins the Great Depression. Many banks close, including The Bank of Sonoma, started by his lifelong Italian friend with the proceeds of the earthquake ferry service. Unable to honor his deposits due to the bank run, his friend dies of a heart attack. His Jewish compatriot and business partner, Levy, also dies soon after hearing of his daughter's death.

Following this tragic news, Dan grows sullen. When May Ling gives him an ultimatum to divorce Jean or lose her and his son, Dan cannot act and May Ling moves to Los Angeles. As the heir and subsequent chairwoman of the Seldon Bank, Jean calls the loans that are keeping Levy and Lavette afloat. Although Jean offers him a position as head of the remains of the company, Dan cannot accept her handout and refuses. Jean grants his request for a divorce and he signs away his share of their communal assets. Bereft of all his money and torn inside by the emotional destruction of his world, Dan wanders the streets as a vagabond in search of work and even spends three months in prison after fighting off some muggers. When a former employee and boat owner gives him a meal and a job, Dan returns to his first love as a fisherman. Having finally grown up, Dan rises from the depths of his humiliation to seek out May Ling. Venturing to Los Angeles, he meets May Ling and they are finally married. At the close of the story, Dan and Jean's daughter visits and begins rekindling a relationship with her father.

== Television adaptation ==
In 1978, the book was adapted as a four-hour, two-part miniseries, directed by Alan J. Levi, and starring Stephen Macht as Daniel Lavette, Sharon Gless as Jean Seldon, and Aimee Eccles as May Ling. The cast also included Richard Anderson, Kevin Dobson, Roddy McDowall, Pernell Roberts, John Saxon, Susan Strasberg, Barry Sullivan, Ina Balin, Lloyd Bochner, Michael Durrell, Yuki Shimoda and Aharon Ipalé. The miniseries was shot on locations including those in Humboldt County, California.
