= The General Zapped an Angel =

1970 science fiction and fantasy story collection by Howard Fast

- First edition
- Author: Howard Fast
- Cover artist: Peter Bramley
- Language: English
- Genre: Science fiction and fantasy
- Publisher: William Morrow
- Publication date: 1970
- Publication place: United States
- Media type: Print (Hardcover, Paperback)
- Pages: 159
- OCLC: 55249

The General Zapped an Angel is a collection of nine science fiction and fantasy stories by American writer Howard Fast, published by William Morrow and Company in 1970. A paperback edition from Ace Books followed later that year. The Ace paperback was reissued in 1978. The contents of this collection were incorporated into Fast's 1975 omnibus, Time and the Riddle.

Fast described the stories as "about the general childishness of man, the only form of life that refuses to grow up."

James Blish gave the collection an unfavorable review, saying the stories "are all too obvious parables, with all too obvious morals." Kirkus Reviews, however, gave General a brief four-star review, singling out the title story for praise.

The second episode of the 2007 TV series Masters of Science Fiction, "The Awakening", was adapted from the title story of this book.

== Contents ==
- "The General Zapped an Angel"
- "The Mouse"
- "The Vision of Milty Boil"
- "The Mohawk"
- "The Wound"
- "Tomorrow's Wall Street Journal"
- "The Interval"
- "The Movie House"
- "The Insects"

All stories were original to the collection except "The Mouse", which first appeared in F&SF in November 1969.
