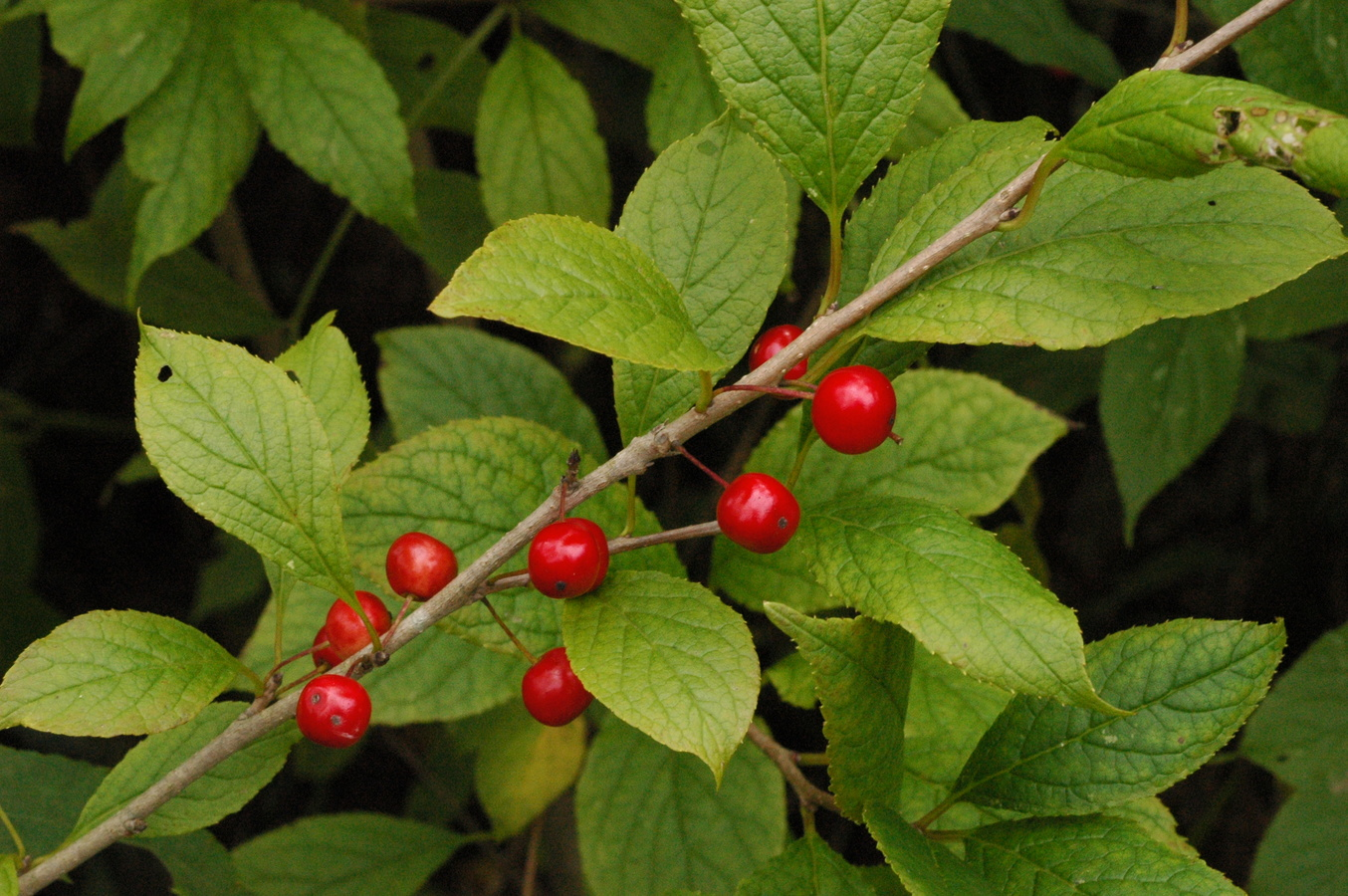
- Cranberry Glades, Pocahontas County, West Virginia

Conservation status
- Vulnerable (NatureServe)

Scientific classification
- Kingdom: Plantae
- Clade: Embryophytes
- Clade: Tracheophytes
- Clade: Angiosperms
- Clade: Eudicots
- Clade: Asterids
- Order: Aquifoliales
- Family: Aquifoliaceae
- Genus: Ilex
- Species: I. collina

Binomial name
- Ilex collina Alexander

= Ilex collina =

Species of holly

Ilex collina is a species of holly known by the common name longstalk holly. It is native to the eastern United States, where it can be found in North Carolina, Virginia, West Virginia, Tennessee, and Georgia.

This plant is a shrub or tree up to 3 to 4 meters tall. The leaves are oval with pointed tips and serrated edges. It is dioecious, with male and female reproductive parts on separate plants. The flowers are yellow-green and four-parted, blooming in May. The fruit is a drupe which is red to yellow in color and just under a centimeter in width.

This plant grows in thickets in moist areas, such as the margins of bogs and ponds. It is often associated with Tsuga canadensis, Betula lenta, Ilex montana, Picea rubens, and Rhododendron maximum.

Threats to this species include habitat loss. There are about 37 occurrences for an estimated total of 4000 individuals.
