= Max (Fast novel) =

- First edition, cover art by Ben Stahl
- Author: Howard Fast
- Language: English
- Publication date: 1982

Max is a 1982 novel by Howard Fast. It tells the story of a young man who leaves his humble roots on the Lower East Side of New York City to find success in Hollywood's earliest stages. Max has had 52 editions of publication in 10 languages.

== Plot ==
"Max" is about the life of Max Britsky, an East European Jewish kid who grows up in great poverty on New York's Lower East Side in the late 19th Century. The eldest of seven siblings, Max's life is shaped by the death of his father when he was twelve and Max's decision to drop out of school and provide for his mother, brothers and sisters. First earning money through such expedients as selling theater tickets to prostitutes and appearing as a low-level comedian in a music hall, Max is among the first to recognize the enormous potential of newly invented motion pictures. He opens a Nickelodeon with great success, expanding to a whole chain of them and graduating to full-fledged movie theaters, later finding a creative young architect to construct for him a whole series of extremely lavish movie palaces all over the country. Then he starts producing his own feature films, becoming one of the first major studio owners in America and eventually moving westwards and establishing an enormous new studio in a hitherto neglected Los Angeles suburb called Hollywood.

Max becomes one of the wealthiest people in America and a leading figure in the growing film industry. His business success contrasts with difficulties involving his family: he appoints his two brothers to positions in his film empire despite warnings about their honesty and speculative dealings.

Max's marriage turns arid and loveless; his wife Sally, a former school teacher whom he met when making the first steps of his career and with whose erudition the school dropout Max was impressed, never truly loved him and in the later years of their marriage comes to actively loath him. While other film moguls engage in an endless round of fleeting affairs with starlets, Max falls deeply in love with his secretary Della and for many years keeps completely faithful to her. He cannot, however, divorce Sally and marry Della because his secretary is a devout Catholic, trapped in an unbreakable Catholic marriage with an abusive husband she did not see for years.

Della's sudden death from pneumonia leaves Max completely devastated and broken. Though continuing his brilliant film career with great success, his personal life is a wasteland, finding no woman who could remotely compare with the lost Della. He consents to divorce Sally and give her in settlement a significant chunk of his film empire, and finds his son and daughter completely estranged from him. In 1927 he is about to embrace what should have been the crowing achievement of his career: the move to the talking film. But at that very moment, Max's long tolerance of his crooked brothers, and his habit of trusting old friends even when they have become untrustworthy, spell his downfall.

It turns out that the brothers' embezzlement had gone far beyond what anyone realized, and that by setting up a series of fake shell companies they stole no less than seven million Dollars - a scandal which cannot be hushed. Even then, Max is still held by his lifelong family loyalty, unable to contemplate sending his brothers to highly deserved prison terms, especially that doing that might cause the death of Max's old and frail mother. Max's rivals inside the company - led by an old colleague who used to be his best friend and who proceeds to stab him in the back - team up with Max's vengeful ex-wife, to whom he gave a seat on the board. In a dramatic board meeting, Max - determined to protect his unworthy brothers to the bitter end - is dethroned and forced to give up the company which he founded and built up.

Max then leaves Holywood, and returns to New York City. He does not give up his generous impulses, continuing to lavishly support his mother. He fortunes shrink from millions to hundreds of thousands - still enough to live a comfortable but meaningless life. Finally he passes away, still quite young, from a heart attack which happens in a movie theater, seated in a back row and watching the latest film put out by the company from which he was exiled.
