= Redemption (Fast novel) =

1999 novel by Howard Fast

- Book cover for the hardcover first edition of the novel
- Author: Howard Fast
- Language: English
- Genre: Romance, Legal drama novel
- Publisher: Harcourt Brace & Company
- Publication date: July 1999
- Publication place: United States
- Media type: Print (Hardback & Paperback)
- Pages: 288 pp (first edition, hardback)
- ISBN: 0-15-100455-2 (first edition, hardback)
- OCLC: 39728002
- Dewey Decimal: 813/.52 21
- LC Class: PS3511.A784 R44 1999

Redemption is a 1999 novel written by American writer Howard Fast, who wrote the novel Spartacus in the 1950s. Redemption is both a romance, a legal drama, and Fast's first suspense novel, depicting Ike Goldman, an old professor emeritus falling in love with a woman named Elizabeth, who is later accused of her ex-husband's murder. The novel is published by Harcourt Brace & Company.
