= Body Language (book) =

1981 book by Allan Pease

- Title page for Body Language: How to read others' thoughts by their gestures (1981)
- Author: Allan Pease
- Publication date: 1981
- ISBN: 9780959365801

Body Language - How to read others' thoughts by their gestures is a best-selling book by Allan Pease, first published in 1981. It has been superseded by his 2004 book The Definitive Book of Body Language: The Secret Meaning Behind People's Gestures, co-authored this time with his wife Barbara.

The book is not to be confused with the original book titled Body Language (1970–71) by Julius Fast, the best-seller which originally popularized the subject, and whose title promptly became the popular term for the science of kinesics.
