= Redemptoris =

Redemptoris may refer to:

- Congregatio Sanctissimi Redemptoris is a Roman Catholic missionary Congregation founded in 1732 by Saint Alphonsus Liguori.
- Divini Redemptoris was an anti-communist encyclical issued by Pope Pius XI.
- Redemptoris Mater is the title of a Mariological encyclical by Pope John Paul II.
- Redemptoris Missio is an encyclical by Pope John Paul II published in 1990 on the topic of missions.

== See also ==
- Redemption (disambiguation)
- Redemptorist (disambiguation)
