= The Hessian =

1972 novel by Howard Fast

- First edition (publ. William Morrow); Cover art by Tom Hall
- Author: Howard Fast
- Language: English
- Publisher: William Morrow and Company
- Publication date: 1972
- Dewey Decimal: 813.52
- LC Class: PZ3.F265 Hg

The Hessian is a 1972 novel by Howard Fast set in the time of the American Revolution, published by William Morrow and Company.

== Plot ==
The book begins with an incident in 1781 when a small detachment of Hessian (German auxiliaries in the British service) soldiers encounter a mentally disabled man, Saul Clamberham, on a Connecticut hill-side. Clamberham follows the Jägers out of confused curiosity, making meaningless markings on a slate. Misunderstanding the situation, an exasperated Hessian officer, with little English, becomes convinced that Clamberham is a spy and has the autistic villager hanged from a tree. Outraged, the local population ambush the Hessians and kill all but a drummer boy who escapes. The narrator of the story: town physician and a Continental Army veteran Evan Feversham, subsequently discovers that the young drummer Hans Pohl is being sheltered in a Quaker family's barn while township authorities hunt for him. After being captured, the Hessian boy is tried for murder. Although his role in the earlier death was limited to beating his drum as the hanging took place, Pohl fatally admits that he would have carried out his duty as a soldier and participated directly in the execution if so ordered. The doctor, himself a victim of prejudice as an English-born Catholic in a small Puritan community, watches helplessly while the German boy is hanged.
