= Redemption Song (Stanage book) =

2008 book by Niall Stanage

Redemption Song: An Irish Reporter Inside the Obama Campaign
- First edition
- Author: Niall Stanage
- Language: English
- Subject: Barack Obama, 2008 U.S. presidential election
- Genre: Nonfiction
- Publisher: Liberties Press
- Publication date: December 1, 2008
- Publication place: Ireland
- Media type: Paperback
- Pages: 272
- ISBN: 1-905483-57-0
- OCLC: 297145509
- Dewey Decimal: 973.932092 22
- LC Class: E906 .S73 2008

Redemption Song: An Irish Reporter Inside the Obama Campaign, is a book by Niall Stanage about the 2008 presidential election campaign of Barack Obama.

It was first published by Liberties Press, Dublin on December 1, 2008, so becoming one of the first books published anywhere to cover the entirety of Obama's campaign. ^{[1]} The author is based in New York—he is a regular contributor to The New York Observer—but was born and raised in Belfast, hence the Irish reference in the book's subtitle, and its initial release through an Irish publisher. It is distributed in North America by Dufour Editions.

Redemption Song received a generally positive critical reception upon its release, being described as "extraordinary...superbly written" by The Irish News, "terrific.... a real insider's account" by the Evening Herald^{[3]} and "sharp, incisive" by The Sunday Business Post.^{[4]}

Redemption Song is broadly sympathetic to Obama. Although it includes some detail about the president-elect's early life, its focus is on the period between Obama's landmark speech to the 2004 Democratic National Convention and his election as president on November 4, 2008. It draws heavily on Stanage's eye-witness campaign trail reporting, including interviews with key Obama advisers, old friends and grassroots volunteers.

== Notes ==
1. "Race to Press" https://www.politico.com/blogs/ben-smith/2008/12/race-to-press-014470, Politico.com, 12-01-2008

2. "The Belfast Man and Barack" http://www.irishnews.com/appnews/616/613/2008/12/6/604767_365743123290TheBelfas.html, The Irish News (Belfast, Northern Ireland), 12-06-2008

3. "The Fas Show" ", Evening Herald (Dublin, Ireland), 12-03-2008

4. "Obama's Victory Through Irish Eyes" http://www.thepost.ie/post/pages/p/story.aspx-qqqt=BOOKS-qqqm=nav-qqqid=37971-qqqx=1.asp. The Sunday Business Post (Dublin, Ireland), 12-07-2008
