= My Glorious Brothers =

1948 novel by Howard Fast

- First edition cover
- Author: Howard Fast
- Cover artist: Alan Haemer
- Language: English
- Subject: Maccabeean revolt
- Genre: Historical novel
- Published: 1948 by Little, Brown
- Publication place: United States
- Media type: Print
- Pages: 280 pp
- OCLC: 1070799
- Dewey Decimal: 296.981
- LC Class: PS3511.A784

My Glorious Brothers is a historical novel by the Jewish American novelist Howard Fast, depicting the 167 BC Maccabeean revolt against the Greek-Seleucid Empire. The book, which deals with Jewish independence and self-determination, was published in 1948, during the 1948 Palestine war.

The story takes place in the days before the rebellion, and during the ensuing battles. The heroes of the novel are the Hasmoneans in general, and Judas Maccabeus in particular. In addition to the historical facts, Fast added some personal rivalries among the Maccabean brothers.

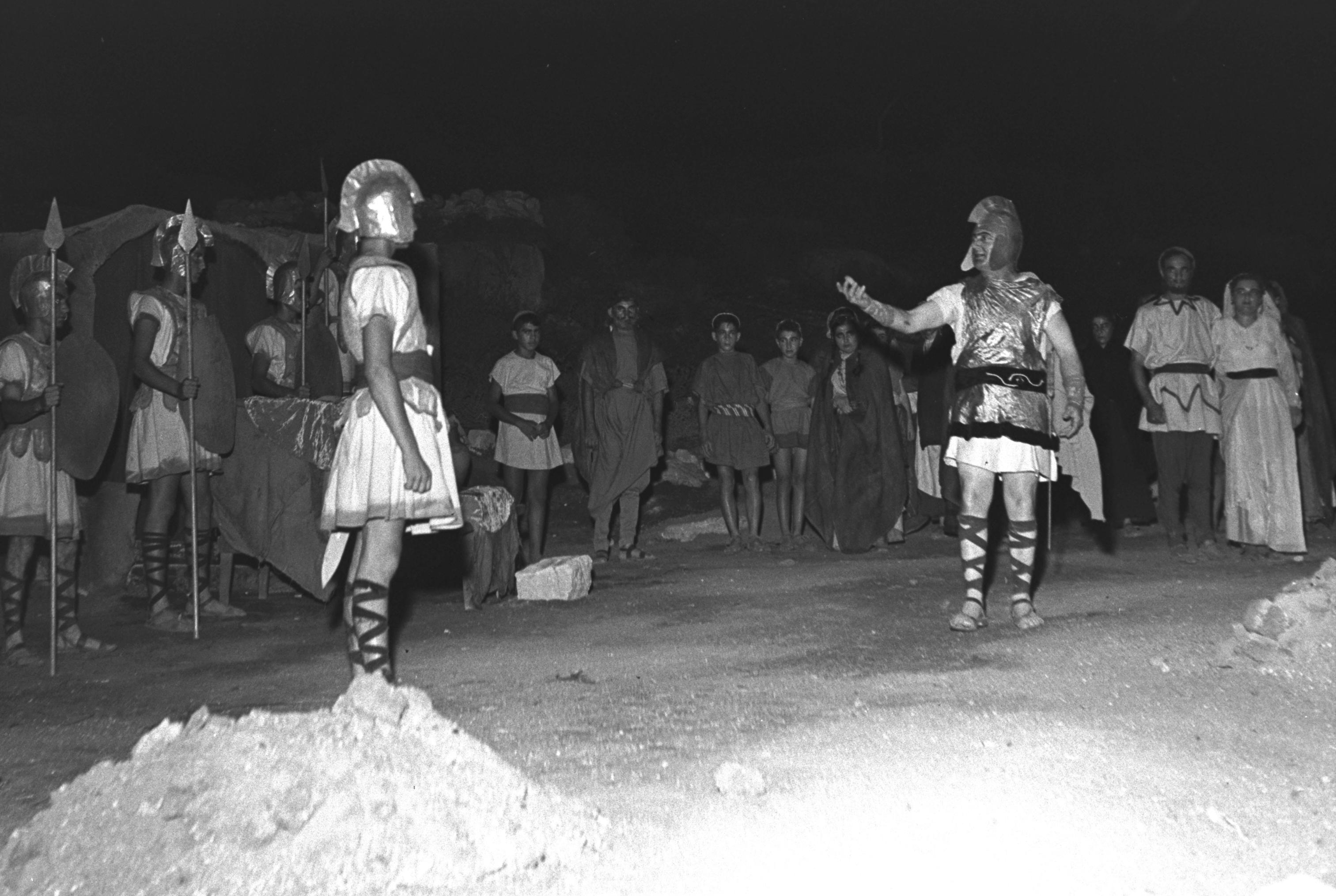
A play based on My Glorious Brothers, performed in kibbutz Sarid, 1951.
