= Mill Point Federal Prison =

Prison in West Virginia, United States

- Interactive map of Mill Point Federal Prison
- Location: Pocahontas County, West Virginia; 38°11′24″N 80°15′46″W
- Status: Closed
- Security class: Minimum security
- Opened: 1938
- Closed: 1959
- Managed by: Federal Bureau of Prisons

Mill Point Federal Prison was a minimum security United States federal prison camp located west of Mill Point in Pocahontas County, West Virginia. It was built on a plot in Monongahela National Forest adjacent to the Cranberry Glades. In operation from 1938 to 1959, all buildings were demolished after its closure.

== Notable inmates ==
- Howard Fast, novelist
- James Lawson, civil rights activist
