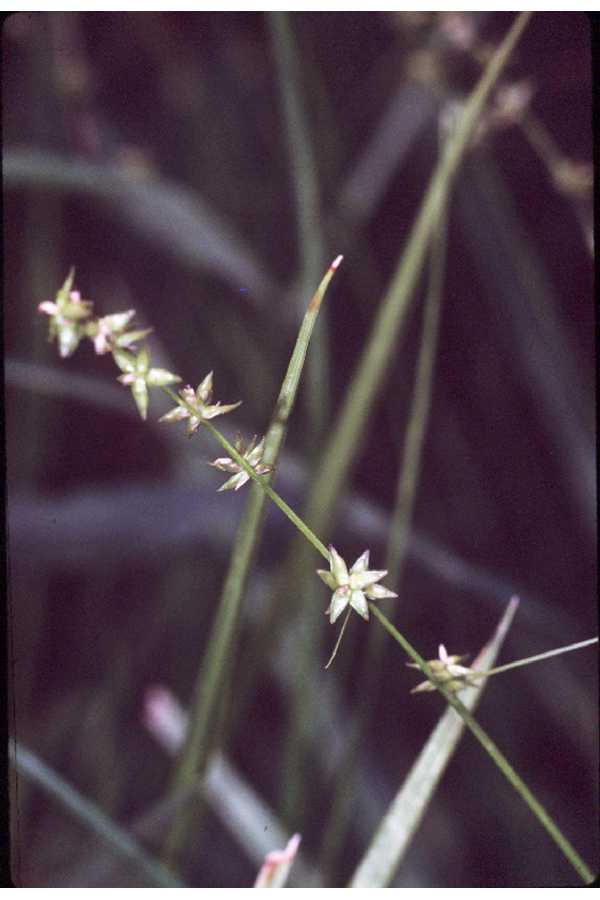

Conservation status
- Least Concern (IUCN 3.1)

Scientific classification
- Kingdom: Plantae
- Clade: Tracheophytes
- Clade: Angiosperms
- Clade: Monocots
- Clade: Commelinids
- Order: Poales
- Family: Cyperaceae
- Genus: Carex
- Species: C. interior

Binomial name
- Carex interior L.H.Bailey

= Carex interior =

Species of grass-like plant

Carex interior is a species of sedge known by the common name inland sedge. It is native to much of North America from Alaska to northern Mexico to the mid-Atlantic United States. It grows in wet habitat, most often in calcareous soils. This sedge produces clumps of stems approaching a meter in maximum height, with a few leaves at each stem. The inflorescence is an open array of star-shaped spikes of flowers covered with gold scales. The fruit is coated in a toothed, red-tipped perigynium.
