= Julius Fast =

American writer (1919 – 2008)

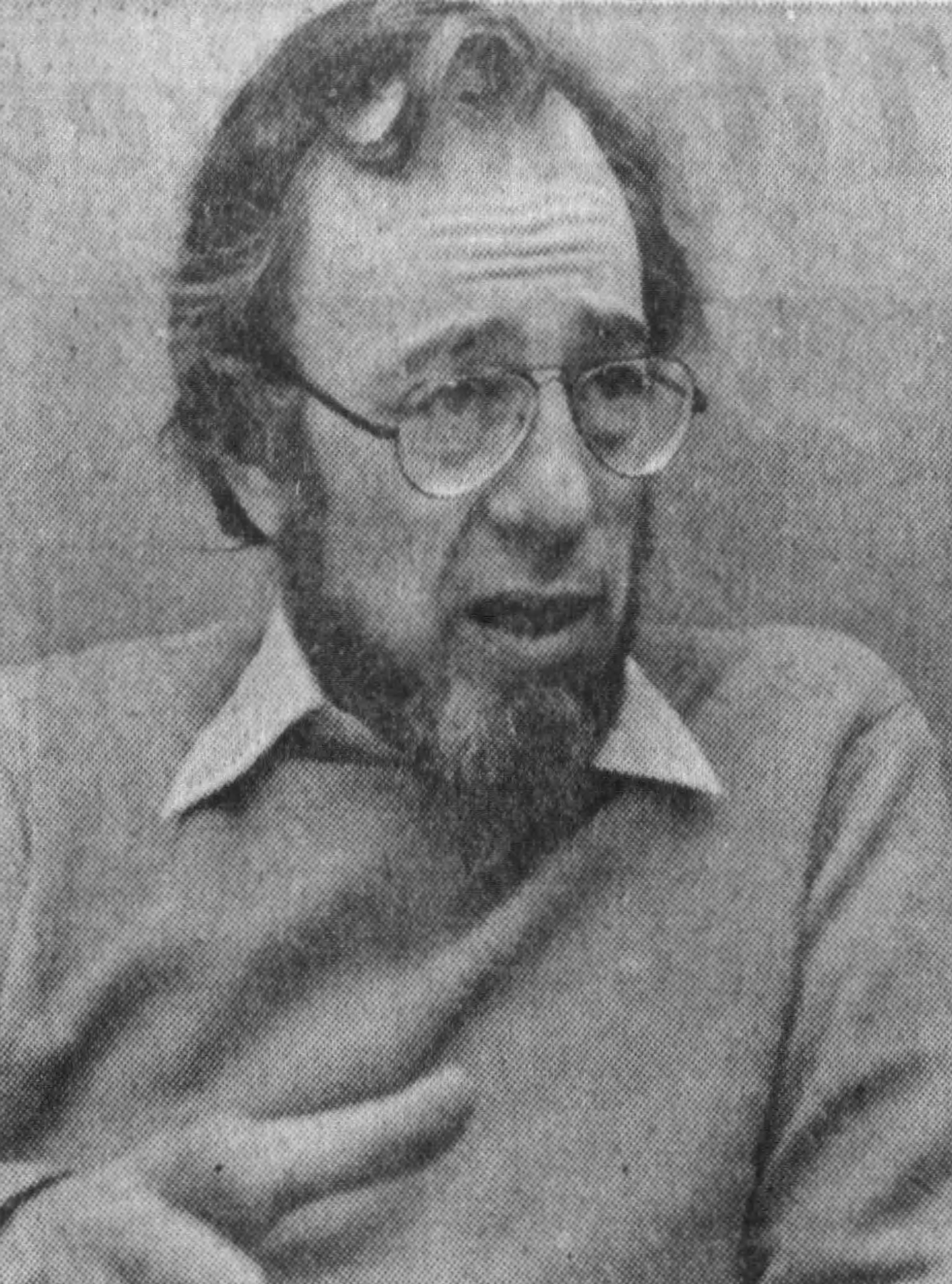
Fast in 1975

Julius Fast (April 17, 1919 – December 16, 2008) was an American author of both fiction and non-fiction. In 1946 he was the first recipient of the Edgar Award given by the Mystery Writers of America for the best first novel of 1945.

Fast was born in Manhattan, the younger brother of novelist Howard Fast. Majoring in pre-med, he earned a bachelor's degree at New York University. He was in the United States Army Medical Corps for three years, serving in a blood lab in Boston and became a sergeant. He edited Out of This World, a 1944 collection of science fiction stories while he was still in the Army.

He married author Barbara Sher in 1946. They co-wrote the 1979 book Talking Between the Lines: How We Mean More Than We Say. Their three children are Jennie Gelfand, Dr. Melissa Morgan and Timothy Fast. In 1997, Fast and his son co-authored The Legal Atlas of the United States.

His first novel, Watchful at Night, written in 1945 while he was still serving in the Army, was given the first award presented at the inaugural Edgar Allan Poe Award in 1946 for Best First Novel by an American Author in 1945. Reviewer Isaac Anderson of The New York Times described his 1947 novel Walk in Shadow as a "profoundly moving novel of crime and punishment", telling the story of a once-honest man who becomes a murderer.

Fast wrote and edited for a number of medical magazines, where his time employed at a podiatry journal provided the background he needed to write the 1970 book You and Your Feet. Other non-fiction works reflected a broad range of subjects, including the 1968 book The Beatles: The Real Story, The New Sexual Fulfillment published in 1972 and his 1979 book Weather Language. His 1988 semiautobiographical novel What Should We Do About Davey? described a gawky teen at a Catskill Mountains summer camp for boys.

He wrote a number of books on request for publishers on subjects of current interest, including writing What You Should Know About Human Sexual Response in months after the 1966 publication of Human Sexual Response by Masters and Johnson.

In 1971, Fast published Body Language—the book that popularized the subject of "kinesics": the study of physical, non-verbal human communication. A "best-seller", it sold nearly 3 million copies. The book's title became the common, popular term for the science it described.

Fast died at age 89 in Kingston, New York on December 16, 2008, after suffering a stroke in 2007.

== Works ==
- Out of This World. an anthology edited by Julius Fast, Penguin Books, 1944.
- Watchful at Night. Farrar & Rinehart, Inc., 1945.
- The Bright Face of Danger. Rinehart & Company, 1946.
- Walk in Shadow. Rinehart & Company, 1947.
- The Iron Cradle, Thomas Y. Crowell Co., 1954.
- A Model for Murder. Rinehart & Company, 1956.
- Street of Fear. Rinehart & Company, 1958.
- Doctor Harry. (under the pseudonym Adam Barnett), Thomas Y. Crowell Co., 1958.
- Blueprint for Life. St. Martin's Press, 1964.
- What You Should Know About Human Sexual Response., G.P. Putnam's Sons, 1966.
- The Beatles: The Real Story. G.P. Putnam's Sons, 1968.
- Body Language. Simon & Schuster Adult Publishing Group, 1970. (ISBN 0671673254)
- The League of Grey Eyed Women. J.B. Lippencott Co., 1970.
- The Incompatibility of Men and Women and how to Overcome it. M. Evans & Company, 1971.
- You and Your Feet. Pelham Books, 1971.
- The New Sexual Fulfillment. Berkley Press, 1972.
- Bisexual Living. M. Evans & Company, 1975. (ISBN 0871311720)
- The Pleasure Book. Stein & Day Publishing, 1975. (ISBN 0812818717)
- The Body Language of Sex Power and Aggression. M. Evans and Co., 1977.
- Creative Coping : A Guide to Positive Living. (with Barbara Fast), Morrow, 1976. (ISBN 0688029930)
- Psyching Up: Over 50 Good Ideas for a Slimmer, Sexier, Healthier You. Stein & Day, 1978. (ISBN 0812821548)
- Weather Language. Wyden Books, 1979. (ISBN 088326157X)
- Talking Between the Lines: How We Mean More Than We Say. (with Barbara Fast) Viking Press, 1979. (ISBN 0670684503)
- Body Politics Tower Books. 1980,. (ISBN 050551513X)
- The Omega-3 breakthrough. Body Press, c1987. (ISBN 0895866250)
- Sexual Chemistry: What it Is, how to Use it. M. Evans & Company, 1983. (ISBN 0871314177)
- Ladies man: an autobiography. by Paul Henreid with Julius Fast, St. Martin's Press, c1984, (ISBN 0312463847)
- What Should we do about Davey?. St. Martin's Press, 1988.
- Subtext: Making Body Language Work in the Workplace. Viking Press, 1991. (ISBN 0670832383)
- The Legal Atlas of the United States. Facts on File, 1997. (ISBN 0816031282)
- A Trunkful of Trouble. Gryphon Books, 2003. (ISBN 1582500517)

== Sources ==
- Julius Fast at the Internet Speculative Fiction Database
