= Howard Fast =

American writer

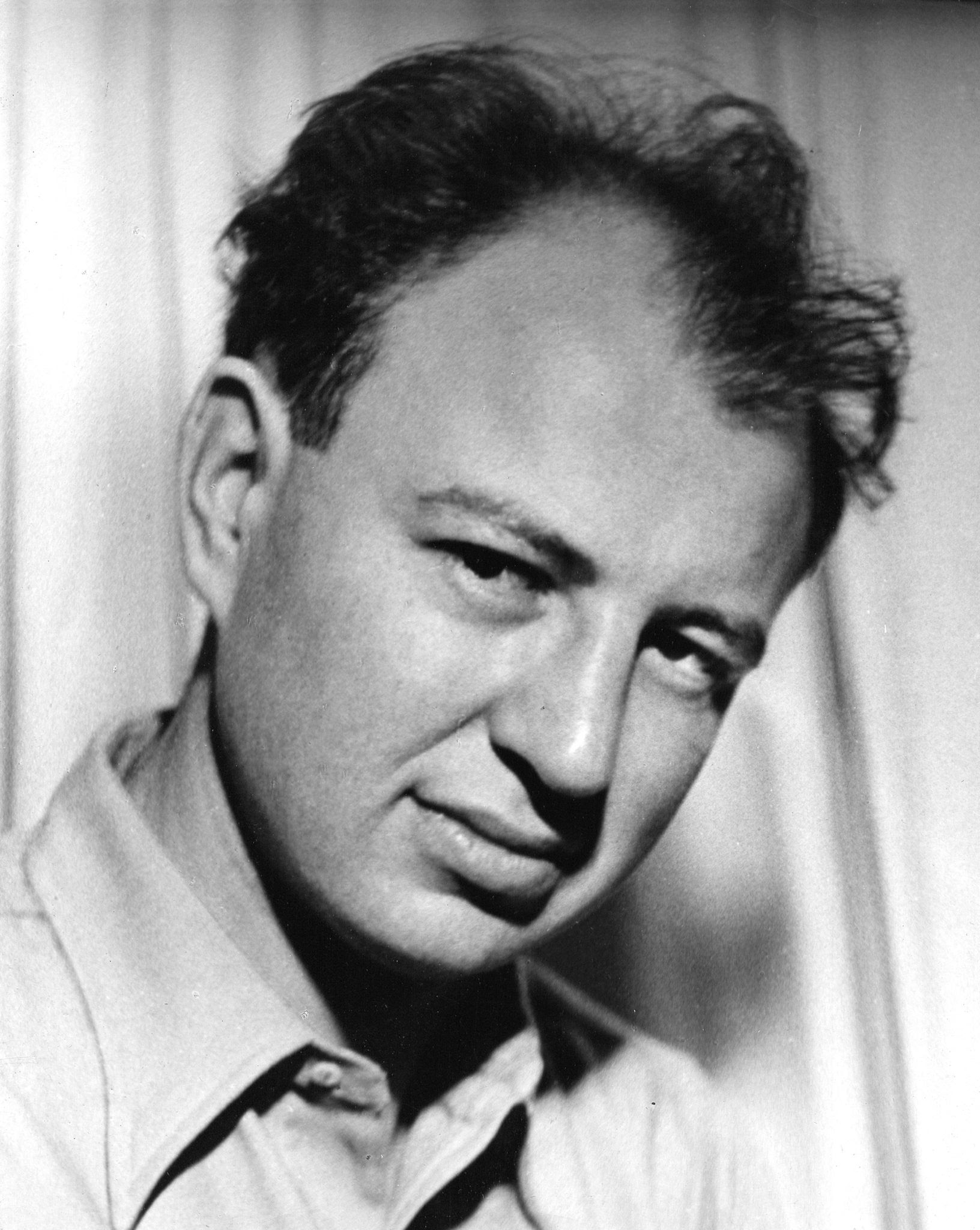
- Fast in 1945
- Born: Howard Melvin Fast; November 11, 1914; New York City, U.S.
- Died: March 12, 2003 (aged 88); Greenwich, Connecticut, U.S.
- Occupation: Novelist
- Spouse(s): Bette Cohen (1937–1994; her death; 2 children); Mercedes O'Connor (1999–2003; his death)
- Writing career
- Pen name: E.V. Cunningham; Walter Ericson
- Period: 20th century
- Genre: Historical fiction
- Notable works: The Last Frontier, Spartacus, April Morning

Howard Melvin Fast (November 11, 1914 – March 12, 2003) was an American author and television writer. Also writing under the pen names E.V. Cunningham, Behn Boruch, and Walter Ericson, his career spanned almost seven decades and several genres, including historical novels and noir. Fast mainly wrote novels, as well as short stories, poems, plays and non-fiction. Among his best known work are Spartacus (1951), April Morning (1961), and The Immigrants (1977). Several of Fast's novels have been adapted into movies and television series, most notably Stanley Kubrick's Spartacus (1960). A staunch communist early in his life, Fast was jailed in the 1950s after testifying before the House Committee on Un-American Activities.

== Biography ==
=== Early life ===
Fast was born in New York City. His mother, Ida (née Miller), was a British Jewish immigrant, and his father, Barney Fast, was a Ukrainian Jewish immigrant who shortened his name from Fastovsky upon arrival in America. When his mother died in 1923 and his father became unemployed, Howard's youngest brother, Julius, went to live with relatives, while he and his older brother, Jerome, sold newspapers. Howard credited his early voracious reading to a part-time job in the New York Public Library.

Fast began writing at an early age. While hitchhiking and riding railroads around the country to find odd jobs, he wrote his first novel, Two Valleys, published in 1933 when he was 18. His first popular work was Citizen Tom Paine, a fictional account of the life of Thomas Paine. Always interested in American history, Fast also wrote The Last Frontier (about the Cheyenne Indians' attempt to return to their native land, and which inspired the 1964 movie Cheyenne Autumn) and Freedom Road (about the lives of former slaves during Reconstruction).

The novel Freedom Road is based on a true story and was made into a miniseries of the same name starring Muhammad Ali, who, in a rare acting role, played Gideon Jackson, an ex-slave in 1870s South Carolina who is elected to the U.S. House and battles the Ku Klux Klan and other racist organizations to enable former slaves to keep the land that they had tended all their lives.

=== Contribution to constitutionalism ===
Fast is the author of the prominent "Why the Fifth Amendment?" essay. This essay explains in detail the purpose of the Fifth Amendment to the Constitution of the United States of America. Fast effectively uses the context of the Red Scare to illustrate the purpose of the "Fifth."

=== Career ===
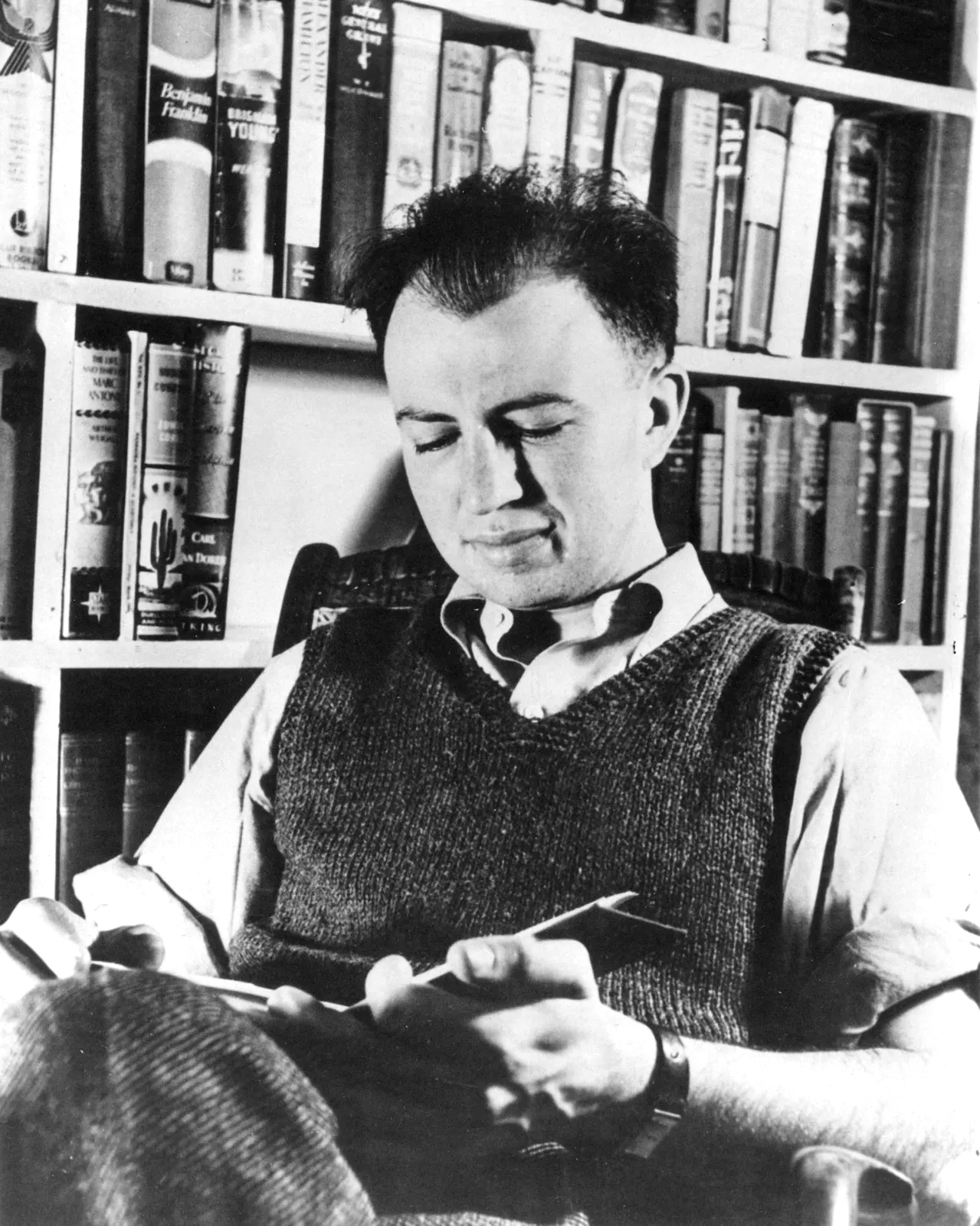
Fast c. 1944

Fast spent World War II working with the United States Office of War Information, writing for Voice of America. In 1943, he joined the Communist Party USA

In 1948, author Harry Barnard accused Fast of copyright infringement, charging he "borrowed liberally" from Barnard's 1938 biography of John Peter Altgeld, Eagle Forgotten, the Life of John Peter Altgeld, for his 1946 book about Altgeld, The American: A Middle Western Legend. Fast settled for $7,500 ($93,725 in 2022 dollars). His publisher also agreed to republish Barnard's book.

In 1950, he was called before the House Committee on Un-American Activities; in his testimony, he refused to disclose the names of contributors to a fund for a home for orphans of American veterans who fought on the Republican side of the Spanish Civil War (one of the contributors was Eleanor Roosevelt), and he was given a three-month prison sentence for contempt of Congress.

While he was at Mill Point Federal Prison, Fast began writing his most famous work, Spartacus, a novel about an uprising among Roman slaves. Blacklisted by major publishing houses following his release from prison, Fast was forced to publish the novel himself. It was a success, going through seven printings in the first four months of publication. (According to Fast in his memoir, 50,000 copies were printed, of which 48,000 were sold.)

He subsequently established the Blue Heron Press, which allowed him to continue publishing under his own name throughout the period of his blacklisting. Just as the production of the film version of Spartacus (released in 1960) is considered a milestone in the breaking of the Hollywood blacklist, the reissue of Fast's novel by Crown Publishers in 1958 effectively ended his own blacklisting within the American publishing industry.

In 1952, Fast ran for Congress in New York's 23rd district on the American Labor Party ticket. He came in fourth place with 5.5% of the vote. During the 1950s he also worked for the Communist newspaper, the Daily Worker. In 1953, he was awarded the Stalin Peace Prize. Later that decade, Fast broke with the Party over issues of conditions in the Soviet Union and Eastern Europe, particularly after Nikita Khrushchev's report "On the Personality Cult and its Consequences" at a closed session of the 20th Congress of the Communist Party of the Soviet Union in February 1956, denouncing the personality cult and dictatorship of Joseph Stalin, and the Soviet military intervention to suppress the Hungarian Revolution of 1956 in November. In his autobiographical work titled The Naked God: The Writer and the Communist Party published in 1957, he wrote: "There was the evil in what we dreamed of as Communists: we took the noblest dreams and hopes of mankind as our credo; the evil we did was to accept the degradation of our own souls—and because we surrendered in ourselves, in our own party existence, all the best and most precious gains and liberties of mankind—because we did this, we betrayed mankind, and the Communist party became a thing of destruction."

In the mid-1950s, Fast moved with his family to Teaneck, New Jersey. In 1974, Fast and his family moved to California, where he wrote television scripts, including such television programs as How the West Was Won. In 1977, he published The Immigrants, the first of a six-part series of novels.

== Personal life and death ==
Fast married his first wife, Bette Cohen, on June 6, 1937. Their children were Jonathan and Rachel. Bette died in 1994. During the marriage, Fast had a relationship in the 1950s with Isabel (Dowden) Johnson, former wife of Lester Cole and later wife to Alger Hiss. In 1999, he married Mercedes O'Connor, who survived him. Mercedes brought three sons to the marriage.

Fast's son Jonathan Fast, himself a novelist, was married to novelist Erica Jong; their daughter is the author Molly Jong-Fast. Howard's younger brother Julius Fast was also a writer.

Fast died in his home in Old Greenwich, Connecticut.

== Works ==
=== Novels ===
- Two Valleys (1933)
- Strange Yesterday (1934)
- Place in the City (1937)
- Conceived in Liberty (1939)
- The Last Frontier (1941)
- Haym Solomon: Son of Liberty (1941)
- Lord Baden-Powell of the Boy Scouts (1941)
- The Romance of a People (1941)
- Goethals and the Panama Canal (1942)
- The Picture-book History of the Jews (1942)
- The Tall Hunter (1942)
- The Unvanquished (1942)
- Citizen Tom Paine (1943)
- Freedom Road (1944)
- Clarkton (1947)
- The Children (1947)
- My Glorious Brothers (1948)
- The Proud and the Free (1950)
- Spartacus (1951) ISBN 1-56324-599-X
- Fallen Angel (1952). Under the pseudonym Walter Ericson
- Tony and the Wonderful Door (1952)
- The Passion of Sacco and Vanzetti (1953)
- Silas Timberman (1954)
- The Story of Lola Gregg (1956)
- Moses, Prince of Egypt (1958)
- The Winston Affair (1959)
- The Golden River (1960)
- April Morning (1961)
- Power (1962)
- Agrippa's Daughter (1964)
- Torquemada (1966)
- The Crossing Series:
1. The Crossing (1971)
2. Bunker Hill (2001). Prequel
- The Hessian (1972)
- Lavette Family Series:
1. The Immigrants (1977)
2. Second Generation (1978)
3. The Establishment (1979)
4. The Legacy (1981)
5. The Immigrant's Daughter (1985)
6. An Independent Woman (1997)
- Max (1982)
- The Outsider (1984)
- The Dinner Party (1987)
- The Pledge (1988)
- The Confession of Joe Cullen (1989)
- The Trial of Abigail Goodman (1993)
- Seven Days in June (1994)
- The Bridge Builder's Story (1995)
- Redemption (1999)
- Greenwich (2000) ISBN 0-15-100620-2

=== Novels under the pseudonym Behn Boruch ===
- In the Beginning: The Story of Abraham (1958)
- The Patriarchs: The Story of Abraham, Isaac and Jacob (1959)
- The Coat of Many Colors: The Story of Joseph (1959)

=== Novels under the pseudonym E.V. Cunningham ===
- Private investigator Alan Macklin:
  - Sylvia (1960), film adaptation Sylvia (1965)
- Phyllis (1962)
- Alice (1963)
- Shirley (1964)
- Helen (1966)
- Insurance investigator Harvey Krim:
1. Lydia (1964)
2. Cynthia (1968)
- New York City CP John Comaday and ADA Larry Cohen:
1. Penelope (1965), adapted as Penelope (1966)
2. Margie (1966)
- The Masao Masuto Mysteries:
1. Samantha, AKA The Case of the Angry Actress (1967)
2. The Case of the One-Penny Orange (1977)
3. The Case of the Russian Diplomat (1978)
4. The Case of the Poisoned Eclairs (1979)
5. The Case of the Sliding Pool (1981)
6. The Case of the Kidnapped Angel (1982)
7. The Case of the Murdered Mackenzie (1984)
- Sally (1967)
- The Assassin Who Gave Up His Gun (1967)
- Millie (1973)
- The Wabash Factor (1986)

=== Short story collections ===
- Patrick Henry and the Frigate's Keel, and other stories of a young nation (1945). Contains 12 short stories:
  - "Patrick Henry and the Frigate's Keel"
  - "Rachel" (1941)
  - "The Pirate and the General"
  - "Neighbor Sam" (1942)
  - "Conyngham"
  - "The Brood" (1939)
  - "The Day of Victory" (1943)
  - "Amos Todd's Vinegar" (1943)
  - "Sun in the West" (1938)
  - "The Bookman" (1936)
  - "The Price of Liberty"
  - "Not Too Hard" (1939)
- Departure, and Other Stories (1949). Contains 19 short stories:
  - "Departure" (1947)
  - "The Old Wagon" (1945)
  - "The Shore Route"
  - "Onion Soup"
  - "An Epitaph for Sidney"
  - "Where Are Your Guns?" (1944)
  - "Spoil the Child" (1938)
  - "The Little Folk from the Hills" (1948)
  - "Who Is He?
  - "The Suckling Pig"
  - "The Rickshaw" (1947)
  - "The Gentle Virtue"
  - "Dumb Swede"
  - "The Gray Ship" (1946)
  - "Three Beautiful Things"
  - "The First Rose of Summer"
  - "Wake Up Glad"
  - "The Police Spy"
  - "Thirty Pieces of Silver" (1949)
- The Last Supper and Other Stories (1955). Contains 16 short stories:
  - "The Last Supper"
  - "The Ancestor"
  - "The Vision of Henry J. Baxter"
  - "A Walk Home"
  - "Coca Cola"
  - "Christ in Cuernavaca", AKA "The Man Who Looked Like Jesus"
  - "The Power of Positive Thinking"
  - "Dignity"
  - "Gentleman from Mississippi"
  - "Journey to Boston" (1949)
  - "The Child and the Ship" (1950)
  - "Sunday Morning"
  - "The Upraised Pinion"
  - "The Holy Child"
  - "My Father"
  - "Coda: The Poet in Philadelphia"
- The Howard Fast Reader; a collection of stories and novels (1960). Contains 3 novels and 21 short stories:
  - "Christ in Cuernavaca", AKA "The Man Who Looked Like Jesus" (1955). Already compiled before
  - "Rachel" (1941). Already compiled before
  - "Onion Soup" (1949). Already compiled before
  - "Three Beautiful Things" (1949). Already compiled before
  - "The First Rose of Summer" (1949). Already compiled before
  - "Where Are Your Guns?" (1944). Already compiled before
  - "The Gentle Virtue" (1949). Already compiled before
  - The Golden River (1960). Novel already published before
  - "Neighbor Sam" (1942). Already compiled before
  - "Departure" (1947). Already compiled before
  - "The Gray Ship" (1946). Already compiled before
  - "The Suckling Pig" (1949). Already compiled before
  - "Old Sam Adams (Three Tales)"
  - "Journey to Boston" (1949). Already compiled before
  - "The Ancestor" (1955). Already compiled before
  - "The Child and the Ship" (1950). Already compiled before
  - "The Vision of Henry J. Baxter" (1955). Already compiled before
  - The Children (1947). Novel already published before
  - "The Little Folk from the Hills" (1948). Already compiled before
  - "Coca Cola" (1955). Already compiled before
  - "The Cold, Cold Box" (1959)
  - "The Large Ant"
  - Freedom Road (1944). Novel already published before
  - "Spoil the Child" (1938). Already compiled before
- The Edge of Tomorrow (1961). Contains 1 novella and 6 short stories:
  - The First Men, AKA The Trap (1960). Novella
  - "The Large Ant" (1960). Already compiled before
  - "Of Time and Cats" (1959)
  - "Cato the Martian" (1960)
  - "The Cold, Cold Box" (1959). Already compiled before
  - "The Martian Shop" (1959)
  - "The Sight of Eden" (1960)
- The Hunter and The Trap (1967). Contains 1 novella and 1 short story:
  - "The Hunter"
  - The First Men, AKA The Trap (1960). Novella already published before
- The General Zapped an Angel (1970). Contains 9 short stories:
  - "The General Zapped an Angel"
  - "The Mouse" (1969)
  - "The Vision of Milty Boil"
  - "The Mohawk"
  - "The Wound"
  - "Tomorrow's Wall Street Journal"
  - "The Interval"
  - "The Movie House"
  - "The Insects
- A Touch of Infinity (1973). Contains 13 short stories:
  - "The Hoop" (1972)
  - "The Price"
  - "A Matter of Size"
  - "The Hole in the Floor"
  - "General Hardy's Profession"
  - "Show Cause"
  - "Not with a Bang"
  - "The Talent of Harvey"
  - "The Mind of God"
  - "UFO"
  - "Cephes 5"
  - "The Pragmatic Seed"
  - "The Egg"
- Time and the Riddle: thirty-one Zen stories (1975). Contains 1 novella and 30 short stories:
  - "UFO" (1973). Already compiled before
  - "The Hole in the Floor" (1973). Already compiled before
  - "General Hardy's Profession" (1973). Already compiled before
  - "Echinomastus Contentii"
  - "Tomorrow's Wall Street Journal" (1970). Already compiled before
  - "A Matter of Size" (1973). Already compiled before
  - "Show Cause" (1973). Already compiled before
  - "The Martian Shop" (1959). Already compiled before
  - "The Pragmatic Seed" (1973). Already compiled before
  - The First Men, AKA The Trap (1960). Novella already published before
  - "The Hoop" (1972). Already compiled before
  - "The Cold, Cold Box" (1959). Already compiled before
  - "The Talent of Harvey" (1973). Already compiled before
  - "The Wound" (1970). Already compiled before
  - "The General Zapped an Angel" (1970). Already compiled before
  - "The Price" (1973). Already compiled before
  - "The Vision of Milty Boil" (1970). Already compiled before
  - "Cato the Martian" (1960). Already compiled before
  - "Not with a Bang" (1973). Already compiled before
  - "The Movie House" (1970). Already compiled before
  - "Cephes 5" (1973). Already compiled before
  - "Of Time and Cats" (1959). Already compiled before
  - "The Interval" (1970). Already compiled before
  - "The Egg" (1973). Already compiled before
  - "The Insects" (1970). Already compiled before
  - "The Sight of Eden" (1960). Already compiled before
  - "The Mind of God" (1973). Already compiled before
  - "The Mohawk" (1970). Already compiled before
  - "The Mouse" (1969). Already compiled before
  - "The Large Ant" (1960). Already compiled before
  - "The Hunter" (1967). Already compiled before
- The Call of Fife and Drum: Three Novels of the Revolution (1987). Contains 3 novels already published before:
  - The Unvanquished (1942)
  - Conceived in Liberty (1939)
  - The Proud and the Free (1950)

=== Short stories ===
Uncollected short stories.

- "Wrath of the Purple" (1932)
- "Stockade" (1936)
- "While They Dance" (1937)
- "Ransom of the Rose" (1937)
- "Beyond the War" (1937)
- "Men Must Fight" (1938)
- "Girl and the General" (1938)
- "Girl With Yellow Hair" (1938)
- "A Child Is Born" (1938)
- "Merry Gentlemen" (1938)
- "Schoolmaster's Empire" (1939)
- "A Man's Wife" (1939)
- "For Always" (1939)
- "A President's Wife" (1939)
- "The Last Night" (1939)
- "Love Marches at Midnight" (1940)
- "Because He Trusted Me" (1940)
- "To Marry With A Stranger" (1940)
- "New Guinea Commandos" (1942)
- "Air Base" (1942)
- "American Seaman" (1942)
- "Nurse on Bataan" (1942)
- "Story of Slim" (1942)
- "Before Dawn" (1942)
- "How Yuang Died for China" (1943)
- "Front-Line Newsman" (1943)
- "Sunk by Jap Bombs!" (1943)
- "Rescue in Singapore" (1943)
- "Stand by for Dive!" (1943)
- "Something had to be told" (1943)
- "Marine on Guadalcanal" (1943)
- "Airbase in the Jungle" (1943)
- "Gray Ship's Captain" (1943)
- "Gnats Against Elephants" (1943)
- ""Ceiling Zero" over Kiska" (1943)
- "A Friendly Hand to Help Him..." (1943)
- "One Ship Was Lost" (1943)
- "Port in the Arctic" (1943)
- "New Hope – From the Sky!" (1943)
- "Detroit in the Desert" (1943)
- "The 'Eggshell' Escapes" (1943)
- "Private Scott and the Axis" (1943)
- "The "Tommies" Got Special Delivery" (1943)
- "One-Man Navy" (1944)
- "Who Is Jesus Christ?" (1944)
- "The Pirate and the General" (1945)
- "The Gallant Ship" (1946)
- "The Gray Ship's Crew" (1946)
- "By Broken Pike, Iron Chain" (1946)
- "Mr. Lincoln" (1947)
- "Memories of Sidney" (1950)
- "A Child is Lost" (1950)
- "Spartacus [from a Novel by Howard Fast]" (1951)
- "The Protest" (1954)
- "Lola Gregg" (1956)

=== Poems ===
- Never to Forget: The Battle of the Warsaw Ghetto (1946, with William Gropper), New York?, Book League of Jewish Peoples Fraternal Order, I.W.O.
- To Nazim Hikmet (1950)
- October Revolution (1950)
- Korean Lullaby (1951–1952)
- Poet in Philadelphia (1954)

=== Plays ===
- Four Bachelor Brothers (1936?, with Ray Barr)
- Minette (1936, with Ray Barr). Unpublished
- Farewell Dimitrios (1950). Unpublished
- The Hammer (1950)
- Thirty Pieces of Silver (1954)
- General Washington and the Water Witch (1956)
- Naked God (1958–1959). Unpublished
- Annabelle (1960). Unpublished
- The Crossing (1962). Unpublished
- The Hill (1964)
- The Adventures of Nat Love (197?). Unpublished
- Lion's Cub (1978)
- David and Paula (1982)
- Citizen Tom Paine (1986)
- Second Coming (1991)
- The Novelist (1992)

=== Nonfiction ===
Articles

- Story of an American. Vito Marcantonio (1946)
- May Day 1947 (1947), New York, United May Day Committee
- Three Names for Fascists (1947)
- Crisis No. 1 (1951)
- Crisis No. 2 (1951)
- Crisis No. 3 (1951)
- May Day 1951 (1951)
- Spain and peace (1951), New York, Joint Anti-Fascist Refugee Committee
- Open Letter to Soviet Writers (1957)

Autobiographies

- The Naked God: The Writer and the Communist Party (1957)
- Being Red (1990), Boston, Houghton Mifflin

Biographies

- The Incredible Tito: Man of the Hour (1944), New York, Magazine House
- The American: A Middle Western Legend. New York: Duell, Sloan And Pearce. 1946.

Essays

- Literature and Reality (1951)
- War and Peace: Observations on Our Times (1990)

Guides

- The Art of Zen Meditation (1977)

History

- The Story of the Jews in the United States (1942)
- Tito and His People (1944)
- Ben Davis Walks on Freedom Road (1945)
- Intellectuals in the fight for peace (1949), New York: Masses & Mainstream
- Peekskill USA (1951), New York, Civil Rights Congress
- The Jews: Story of a People (1968) ISBN 0-440-34444-1

== Filmography ==
- Rachel and the Stranger (1948), based on the 1941 short story "Rachel".
- Spartacus (1960), based on the 1951 novel Spartacus.
- Man in the Middle (1963), based on the 1959 novel The Winston Affair.
- Cheyenne Autumn (1964), inspired by the 1941 novel "The Last Frontier" (as well as Mari Sandoz's "Cheyenne Autumn")
- Mirage (1965), based on the 1952 novel Fallen Angel, originally published under the pseudonym Walter Ericson.
- Freedom Road (1979) (miniseries), based on the 1944 novel Freedom Road.
- April Morning (1987), based on the 1961 novel April Morning.
- The Crossing (2000) based on the 1971 novel The Crossing.
- Spartacus (2004) (miniseries), based on the 1951 novel Spartacus.
