= Spartacus (Fast novel) =

1951 historical novel by Howard Fast

- Cover of the first US hardcover edition
- Author: Howard Fast
- Language: English
- Genre: Historical novel
- Publisher: Howard Fast / Blue Heron Press
- Publication date: 1951
- Publication place: United States
- Media type: Print (hardback & paperback)
- Pages: 363 pp
- OCLC: 144801069

Spartacus is a 1951 historical novel by American writer Howard Fast. It is about the historic slave revolt led by Spartacus around 71 BC. The book inspired the 1960 film directed by Stanley Kubrick and the 2004 TV adaptation by Robert Dornhelm.

== Plot summary ==
Spartacus begins with three young Roman patricians – Caius, his sister Helena and her friend Claudia, commencing a journey from Rome to Capua along the Via Appia a few weeks after the final suppression of the slave revolt. The road is lined by "tokens of punishment" – slaves crucified in the immediate aftermath of the revolt. During the first day of their travel the party encounter several representative individuals; a minor politician, a prosperous businessman of the equestrian class, an eastern trader and a young officer of the legions; all of whom give their respective perspectives on the rising. On arrival at a palatial country villa where they are to spend the night, the trio meet with other guests, both historical and fictional, who either played key roles in the events just finished or who have sufficient perception to analyze the significance of slavery as an institution within the Roman Republic.

From the encounters at the Villa Salaria, the focus of the novel moves to occasions before and during the actual rising of the slaves. The emphasis is on Spartacus, his life in the mines and as a gladiator; his character, powers of leadership and dreams of a just society where exploitation and cruelty have been eliminated.

Spartacus was born as the grandson of a slave and sold to work in the harsh gold-mines of Nubia. Eventually, he and several Thracian slaves, including his comrade Gannicus, are bought by a wealthy lanista, Lentulus Batiatus, who owns and trains a large number of gladiators at a school near the Italian city of Capua. There, Spartacus and Gannicus meet other gladiators, a Gaul named Crixus, a Jew named David, and an African named Nordo.

Spartacus trains as a gladiator. He begins a relationship with a German girl named Varinia, who is one of several dozen female slaves that Batiatus keeps for the pleasure of his gladiators. Provoked by the death of Nordo when he turns against their Roman masters, the gladiators and slaves rise up in revolt. Led by Spartacus and Crixus, the rebels overwhelm their trainers and guards, force Lentulus Batiatus to flee, and destroy the city garrison sent to stop them.

== Narrative structure ==
The novel changes between third-person omniscient past and present tenses. The narrative structure is based on several members of the Roman ruling hierarchy (Crassus, Gracchus, Caius, and Cicero) who, using the past tense, are shown meeting to relate tales of the events in Spartacus's life and uprising. The tales are told in the present tense directly by the narrator, with details going far beyond the Romans' possible knowledge. The novel deviates from and extends known historical facts.

== Theme ==
The novel's central theme is that man's most basic universal values are freedom, love, hope, and finally life. Oppression and slavery strip these away until the oppressed have nothing to lose by uprising. Oppressive systems are held together by political systems. Spartacus stands as an eternal symbol of how man must fight against political systems that oppress man's values:

A time would come when Rome would be torn down – not by the slaves alone, but by slaves and serfs and peasants and by free barbarians who joined with them. And so long as men labored, and other men took and used the fruit of those who labored, the name of Spartacus would be remembered, whispered sometimes and shouted loud and clear at other times.

== Publication ==
Howard Fast self-published the novel in the United States during the McCarthy era in 1951. He began writing it as a reaction to his imprisonment for charges stemming from his earlier involvement in the Communist Party USA. He had refused to disclose to Congress the names of contributors to a fund for a home for orphans of American veterans of the Spanish Civil War. He was imprisoned for three months in 1950 for contempt of Congress.

The final page of the first edition describes some of his difficulties in publishing:

Readers who may wonder at the absence of a publisher's imprint are informed that this book was published by the author. This was made necessary when he learned that no commercial publisher, due to the political temper of the times, would undertake the publication or distribution of the book. Its publication was made possible by hundreds of people who believed in the book and bought it in advance of publication, so that the money would be forthcoming to pay for its printing. The author wishes to thank these people with all his heart. He is also most grateful to the many people who helped with the preparation of the manuscript, with the editing of it, and with the design and manufacture of the book. He hopes that for some future edition, at a time when it would not subject them to danger and reprisal, to be able to name these people and extend personal thanks to each in turn.

The cover illustration of the first edition is by African-American artist Charles White.

In the 1991 paperback version (ibooks, distributed by Simon & Schuster; ISBN 0-7434-1282-6), the author has a short introduction, "Spartacus and the Blacklist", which expands on the conditions surrounding the writing and publishing of the work.

== See also ==
- Spartacus, 1931 novel by Scottish writer Lewis Grassic Gibbon.
- The Gladiators, Arthur Koestler's 1939 novel on Spartacus.
