= List of Spartacus (TV series) characters =

Spartacus is a Starz television series that focuses on the historical figure of Spartacus, a Thracian gladiator who, from 73 to 71 BC, led a major slave uprising against the Roman Republic. Executive produced by Steven S. DeKnight and Rob Tapert, the show focuses on the events of Spartacus's early life leading to his recorded history. This article is a list of characters from the television series.

== Cast ==
=== Main ===
Actor	Character	Seasons				
Actor	Character	Blood and Sand	Gods of the Arena	Vengeance	War of the Damned	House of Ashur
Actor	Character	2010	2011	2012	2013	2025
Gladiators & Slaves
Andy Whitfield	Spartacus	Main	Archived Footage			Archived Footage
Liam McIntyre	Spartacus			Main	Main	Archived Footage
Manu Bennett	Crixus	Main	Main	Main	Main	Archived Footage
Erin Cummings	Sura	Main	Archived Footage	Archived Footage	Archived Footage	
Peter Mensah	Oenomaus	Main	Main	Main	Guest	Archived Footage
Nick E. Tarabay	Ashur	Main	Main	Main		Main
Katrina Law	Mira	Main		Main	Archived Footage	Archived Footage
Dustin Clare	Gannicus		Main	Main	Main	Archived Footage
Marisa Ramirez	Melitta		Main	Archived Footage	Archived Footage	
Dan Feuerriegel	Agron	Recurring		Main	Main	Archived Footage
Lesley-Ann Brandt	Naevia	Recurring	Recurring			
Cynthia Addai-Robinson	Naevia			Main	Main	Archived Footage
Ellen Hollman	Saxa			Recurring	Main	Archived Footage
Ditch Davey	Nemetes			Recurring	Main	Archived Footage
Pana Hema Taylor	Nasir			Recurring	Main	
Jenna Lind	Kore				Main	
Graham McTavish	Korris					Main
Tenika Davis	Achillia					Main
Jamaica Vaughan	Hilara					Main
Ivana Baquero	Messia					Main
Leigh Gill	Satyrus					Main
Jordi Webber	Tarchon					Main
Romans
John Hannah	Quintus Lentulus Batiatus	Main	Main	Archived Footage		Archived Footage
Lucy Lawless	Lucretia	Main	Main	Main		Guest
Viva Bianca	Ilithyia	Main		Main		
Jaime Murray	Gaia		Main	Archived Footage		
Craig Parker	Gaius Claudius Glaber	Recurring		Main	Archived Footage	Archived Footage
Brett Tucker	Publius Varinius			Main		
Simon Merrells	Marcus Licinius Crassus				Main	Archived Footage
Christian Antidormi	Tiberius Licinius Crassus				Main	
Anna Hutchison	Laeta				Main	
Todd Lasance	Gaius Julius Caesar				Main	
Jackson Gallagher	Gaius Julius Caesar					Recurring
Claudia Black	Cossutia					Main
India Shaw-Smith	Viridia					Main

=== Recurring ===
Actor	Character	Seasons				
Actor	Character	Blood and Sand	Gods of the Arena	Vengeance	War of the Damned	House of Ashur
Actor	Character	2010	2011	2012	2013	2025
Gladiators & Slaves
Ioane King	Rhaskos	Recurring	Recurring	Recurring		
Raicho Vasilev	Gnaeus	Recurring	Recurring			
Antonio Te Maioha	Barca	Recurring	Recurring			
Brooke Williams	Aurelia	Recurring		Guest		
Eka Darville	Pietros	Recurring				
Ande Cunningham	Duro	Recurring				
Jai Courtney	Varro	Recurring			Archived Footage	
Shane Rangi	Dagan		Recurring			
Jessica Grace Smith	Diona		Recurring			
Josef Brown	Auctus		Recurring			
Heath Jones	Donar			Recurring	Recurring	Archived Footage
Barry Duffield	Lugo			Recurring	Recurring	Archived Footage
Gwendoline Taylor	Sibyl				Recurring	
Vince Colosimo	Heracleo				Recurring	
Blessing Mokgohloa	Castus				Recurring	
Evander Brown	Ephesius					Recurring
Graham Vincent	Hedylus					Recurring
Louis Hunter	Erato					Recurring
Donald Ross	Salvius					Recurring
Dan Hamill	Celadus					Recurring
Mikey Thompson	Musicus					Recurring
Daniel Bos	Balbus					Recurring
Duane Wichman Evans	Dacus					Recurring
Eden Hart	Elata					Recurring
Romans
Craig Walsh Wrightson	Marcus Decius Solonius	Recurring	Recurring	Archived Footage		
Greg Ward	Mercato	Recurring		Recurring		
John Bach	Magistrate Titus Calavius	Recurring		Archived Footage		
Lliam Powell	Numerius Calavius	Recurring				
Jason Hood	Cossutius		Recurring	Recurring		
Jeffrey Thomas	Titus Lentulus Batiatus		Recurring	Guest		
Stephen Lovatt	Tullius		Recurring			
Gareth Williams	Vettius		Recurring			
Peter Feeney	Quinctilius Varus		Recurring	Archived Footage		
Kevin J. Wilson	Senator Albinius	Guest		Recurring		
Hanna Mangan-Lawrence	Seppia			Recurring		
Tom Hobbs	Seppius			Recurring		
Luke Pegler	Marcus			Recurring		
Paul Glover	Salvius			Recurring		Archived Footage
Timothy Raby	Magistrate Gallienus			Recurring		
Peter McCauley	Lucius Caelius			Recurring		
Colin Moy	Senator Metellus				Recurring	
Roy Snow	Rufus				Recurring	Archived Footage
Aaron Jakubenko	Sabinus				Recurring	
Andrew McFarlane	Gabinius					Recurring
Simon Arblaster	Proculus					Recurring
Arlo Gibson	Opiter					Recurring
Cameron Rhodes	Uvidus					Recurring
Jaime Slater	Cornelia					Recurring

== Main characters ==
=== Spartacus ===
- Portrayed by Andy Whitfield in Blood and Sand, Liam McIntyre in Vengeance and War of the Damned

A Thracian who becomes a gladiator in the ludus of Lentulus Batiatus. Spartacus disobeys an order by legatus Gaius Claudius Glaber, who refused to send his men to protect Spartacus' village. Spartacus' wife Sura is condemned to slavery, and Spartacus is taken to Rome to be executed in the games by Glaber. Instead of dying, Spartacus kills the gladiators sent to kill him, and as a result Spartacus cannot be executed: Glaber would lose faith with the people, as Spartacus has become popular with the crowd. Batiatus purchases Spartacus to either win patronage from Glaber by having him killed, or use the Thracian's popularity for his own ends. Spartacus comes to live at the ludus and eventually proves himself a skilled gladiator. He makes an enemy of Crixus, especially when they defeat Theokoles in which fight Crixus is wounded and Spartacus inherits his title of 'the Champion of Capua'. Batiatus makes a deal with Spartacus that if he continues to fight for Batiatus, he will find Spartacus' wife for him; however, she is brought to the ludus dying from an apparent attack. It is revealed immediately afterwards that Batiatus had Sura murdered so Spartacus would stay at the ludus, as he would have no reason to gain his freedom. Eventually, Spartacus finds out and plans vengeance against Batiatus. He gains the support of Crixus and at a party to announce Batiatus' pursuit of political office, Spartacus leads a slave revolt that kills Batiatus and almost all the people in attendance. After she helps him escape the ludus, Mira becomes Spartacus' lover, until she comes to realize he would never love her the way she loved him. Spartacus also achieves vengeance against Glaber for the misery he caused him and his wife, brutally killing the Roman leader after a protracted conflict. The Thracian eventually has an army of hundreds of thousands of freed slaves, who free one city after another. The tensions between him and Crixus heat up again when Crixus wishes to take their army to Rome, whereas Spartacus would head up to the mountains. He also becomes involved with a former Roman woman named Laeta, who now stands slave with the rest of his people. Spartacus hosts a series of games like the ones he used to fight in, to honor Crixus after his death. In the final battle against Crassus, Spartacus leads his people into the fight, and has Gannicus with another group approach from behind. Although they seem to be fighting their way through the army at first, the rebels eventually start to fall one by one. Spartacus then faces off with Crassus, but when he finally has the Roman on his knees, Spartacus is struck from behind, when three spears pierce his body. Agron and others come to his rescue and take him away before Crassus can finish him, but Spartacus has been mortally wounded, and asks his friends to move on without him. He then dies in the hands of Agron, longing to see his wife again. He is buried at the foot of the mountain, with Agron's shield as a gravestone. Coincidentally, the shield has a red serpent on it, thus making Sura's prediction about Spartacus falling before the great, red serpent, come true.

=== Quintus Gnaeus Cornelius Lentulus Batiatus ===
- Portrayed by John Hannah.

A lanista and Spartacus' master. Insatiably greedy and ambitious, he schemes to become a Roman magistrate. His schemes including ridding himself of his business rival Solonius, as well as gaining sufficient advantage with the local magistrate Calavius and legatus Glaber so that they will provide him patronage. However, after refusing to support his ambition, Batiatus kidnaps and kills Calavius. Using blackmail and the aid of Ashur, he has Solonius condemned to the arena, framed for Calavius's murder, and earns the support of Glaber by threatening to reveal that his wife has murdered a noble woman. His plans to control Spartacus (killing his wife so he has no reason to attain his freedom) are uncovered and he is slain by Spartacus in the season 1 finale.

=== Lucretia ===
- Portrayed by Lucy Lawless.

Lucretia is Batiatus' wife.

Lucretia acts as a willing partner in order to advance Batiatus' goals, and uses deception and blackmail to further his aims.

In Gods of the Arena, Lucretia poisons Batiatus' father to stop him from disowning his son, framing Tullius for the deed. Despite her loyalty to her husband, she regularly has sex with Crixus. Originally, she did this reluctantly in order to give Batiatus a child, but later started to enjoy it. She jealously resents any other attention to Crixus and, when Ilithyia requests a private session with him, she becomes enraged and tricks Ilithyia into having sex with Spartacus and reveals the event to Licinia. Lucretia eventually falls pregnant with Crixus' child. She is furious when she discovers that Crixus is in love with her body slave, Naevia. She has Naevia sold, and convinces Batiatus to poison Crixus' food so he will be unable to defeat Spartacus in an exhibition match. When the rebels take control of the villa, she is critically wounded, by an angered Crixus to prevent her from bearing his child, and out of revenge for her treatment of Naevia and himself.

In Vengeance, Lucretia is discovered by Glaber when he takes up residence in the former house of Batiatus. As the only survivor of Spartacus's massacre, she becomes viewed as an oracle by the people. After the massacre and Quintus' death, Lucretia was found and cleaned up by Ashur, initially gaining her trust. But he later turns on her after realizing that Lucretia does not truly see him as her equal or partner-in-crime, but as an expendable pawn, and will eventually dispose of him. He then forces her to become his slave and unwilling lover, but his brutal treatment causes Lucretia's sanity and will to live to erode. Regardless, Ashur plans for Lucretia to become his wife after Glaber sets him free. Despite their previous animosity, she and Ilithyia apparently slowly rekindle their friendship.

In the season 2 finale, however, Lucretia is revealed to hold a grudge against Ilithyia for her role in the death of Lucretia's husband, Quintus, and Lucretia's fall from grace, and plans a revenge against Ilithya, as well as Ashur, due to being becoming a victim of Ashur's rapes. As Ilithyia prepares to give birth to her child, Lucretia takes vengeance on Ilithyia and kills her servants. Once the child is born, Lucretia claims it as hers and Quintus' son. Her plan was to bring a son to her husband in the afterlife, so she then commits suicide by falling off a cliff, taking the baby with her.

In House of Ashur, Lucretia appears as a spirit in the underworld, who mocks Ashur for all of his misdeeds, including the repeated rapes he had committed against her, which had ultimately led to his deserved death. While doing this, she attempts to conceal her own torment, as she is trapped for eternity with the man who had inflicted such deep emotional and psychological wounds on her. But Lucretia offers Ashur a second chance of life in an alternate timeline, one where he was never killed. But it still remains unclear, whether this is actually Lucretia or just simply a spirit from the underworld, who took on her physical appearance.

=== Oenomaus ===
- Portrayed by Peter Mensah.

Doctore, Gallic gladiator, and trainer of gladiators in Batiatus' ludus. He was rescued from the Pits as a young man by Titus Batiatus and in gratitude, pledges his loyalty to the House of Batiatus. He believes in the honor of the ludus and the House of Batiatus until he learns differently. He is married to Lucretia's body slave, Melitta, until her accidental death by poisoning. Oenomaus is good friends with Gannicus. He was a gladiator until he was seriously wounded in a battle against Theokoles and becomes the new Doctore when he is forced to kill the previous one. Batiatus proposes to make Oenomaus master of the ludus if he is successful in his political ambition. He provides limited aid in the rebellion of the ludus and makes an unsuccessful attempt on Ashur. He keeps himself separated from the rebels at first, and resigns himself back to fighting in the Pits. He is captured by Ashur and tortured for information on Spartacus, eventually learning of the affair between Melitta and Gannicus. He is condemned, along with Crixus and Rhaskos, to fight to his death in the arena and angrily engages Gannicus. He is rescued by Spartacus, and Gannicus later joins the rebels. Oenomaus slowly begins to forgive him. His eye is damaged beyond medical help after a fight with the Egyptian. Oenomaus is slain in the season 2 finale by the Egyptian, following a brazen attack on the Romans to escape the mountaintop on which the slaves were trapped. But Gannicus avenges him by killing the Egyptian. Before dying, he tells Gannicus that he and Melitta will be waiting to greet him in the afterlife.

=== Crixus ===
- Portrayed by Manu Bennett.

A Gaul, he is Batiatus' top gladiator, the lover of Lucretia and the "Champion of Capua". In Gods of the Arena, he is shown to be a slave of Tullius and hauls stone to build the new arena. After witnessing his potential, Batiatus purchases him to curry favor with Tullius. He rises in the ranks of the ludus, eventually becoming second only to Gannicus. When Gannicus earns his freedom, Crixus becomes the new Champion. He and Ashur are bitter enemies and he is revealed to have been the one who burnt and crippled Ashur in the opening games of the new arena. In Blood and Sand, he initially despises Spartacus and believes in the mark of the brotherhood, i.e. being a gladiator is a huge honor and service to the city. However, when paired in a match with Spartacus against an unbeaten foe, Theokoles, he is severely wounded, costing him the title. Spartacus emerges victorious from the match and becomes the new "Champion", giving Crixus more reason to hate him. Crixus is the object of lust for many women, but only desires to be with Naevia. Ashur discovers their affair and manipulates Crixus into revealing it to their masters. Once their affair is discovered, he is beaten and Naevia is sold off. Crixus reveals to a scorned Lucretia that he had never loved her, only Naevia, and shows little care when she claims her unborn child is his. He and Spartacus are scheduled to fight to the death and the two talk the day before. He originally refuses to join in Spartacus' rebellion but the two strike an accord; if Spartacus wins, he will find and free Naevia; if Crixus wins, the rebellion will not happen, but he will kill Batiatus for what he did to Sura. After Crixus discovers his food was drugged, he decides to take part in the rebellion, launching Spartacus into the balcony. In revenge for her actions against Naevia and for poisoning him, Crixus critically injures Lucretia, killing their unborn child. He later sets out to locate Naevia, and finds her in the mines. Though he is captured by the Romans and sentenced to death, Spartacus rescues him and he is finally reunited with Naevia. He helps her to fight like a warrior, so that she will never be anyone's slave again. When the rebellion causes their army to grow to hundreds of thousands, Crixus grows impatient and wishes to set foot to Rome, and take the city. He eventually does so, with Naevia, Agron, and many others, and although victory seems near, it is soon discovered they've been led to a trap, and Crixus is eventually beheaded by Tiberius, the son of Marcus Crassus, who leads the army against Spartacus. Spartacus hosts a series of games in his honor, much like the ones they used to have in the arena, where his strongest people fight the Roman soldiers they've captured.

=== Ashur ===
- Portrayed by Nick E. Tarabay.

An Assyrian and former gladiator. It is shown in Gods of the Arena that Ashur was acquired by Batiatus along with his fellow Syrian Dagan. Dagan does not speak the Roman tongue and Ashur is required to translate, often delivering incorrect translations to further his own needs. He and Dagan acquire the mark of the brotherhood after helping assault Vettius, rather than after the test against a seasoned gladiator. Though Dagan eventually earns the respect of the other gladiators with his combat skills, Ashur proves a much less competent fighter and is the subject of constant scorn. At a party organised for the Capuan elite, he tricks Dagan into being raped by a Roman, after which even Dagan turns on him. In a desperate attempt to avoid deportation to the mines, he partially blinds Dagan. In the opening games for the new arena, he makes it to the primus, where he manages to kill his former comrade. His leg is then crippled by Crixus so that Crixus can challenge Gannicus one-on-one.

In Blood and Sand, Ashur serves Batiatus as a bookkeeper and henchman. His machinations cost Barca and Pietros their lives does not have to pay a large bet they intended to use in order to buy their freedom. His aid proves invaluable in removing Calavius and Solonius. Batiatus promotes him from the ludus and makes him a part of his household as a result. He discovers Crixus and Naevia's affair, and goads Crixus into revealing it to their masters. His treachery in the fate of Barca and Calavius is uncovered, which almost costs him his life at the hands of Oenomaus, but he manages to hide under a Roman soldier's corpse.

In Vengeance, it is revealed that Ashur had managed to save Lucretia and stitched her wound. He uses his talents to serve Glaber, acquiring a fortune in the process. Although they are initially partners, Asher later turns on Lucretia once he realizes that she sees him as an expendable pawn. He begins regularly raping Lucretia, forcing her to become his slave and unwilling lover, and plans for Lucretia to become his wife after Glaber sets him free. After a discussing with Lucretia, Ilithyia manipulates Glaber into turning against Ashur and Ashur meets his end in the season finale when he is forced to deliver a message to Spartacus, and the slaves on Mt Vesuvius: turn over Spartacus and the Romans will go easy on the slaves. Crixus challenges Ashur to a fight, but Naevia insists on fighting him. Ashur defeats her, but his arrogance overcomes him, and she takes advantage of the opportunity and decapitates him.

In House of Ashur, Ashur is visited by Lucretia in the underworld, who mocks him for all of his misdeeds. However she offers a second chance of life in an alternate timeline, one where he was never killed at the Mt Vesuvius, (but this is not shown how he survived), and allied with Crassus and Caesar. In this reality, during the final battle, he killed Spartacus saving Crassus and gained Batiatus's ludus for his help to end the rebellion. Ashur awakens as a Dominus possessing his own gladiators, two lovers Hilara and Messia, and his doctore Korris and fighting new enemies to secure his place. He kills Rhodius one gladiator who dare challenged him. After one of his better gladiators, Logas, is killed by three gladiators called Ferox Brothers owned by Proculus, one of his new rivals and enemies, Ashur met a numidian warrior called Neferet and seeing her prowess, buys her and named her Achillia. But she wants to be free, she tries to kill Ashur, but he proposes her an alternative : if she becomes a gladiator, that she fights for him and she calls him Dominus, she will be free. Achillia accepts and Ashur wins his new warrior. Ashur gives her the mark of Brotherhood and nicknames The Goddess of Death. He meets Viridia, Gabinius and Cossutia's daughter. She thanks to have killed Spartacus. Later, he saves her from an attack of a group of Cilician Pirates and Viridia's admiration for him increases. Ashur receives a message from Crassus, informing him that he comes to Capua but finally it is Caesar and his wife Cornelia who arrive to his villa instead of Crassus. They sleep with Ashur's lovers, Hilara and Messia to assert their dominance over him. Caesar reveals to Ashur that he has orchestrated the attack of the Cilician Pirates to gain Gabinius's favors part of a plot by Crassus to sway Gabinius against Pompey. Later, Caesar informs Ashur that he is forced to leave early to meet Pompey but Cornelia will stay behind. Became the champion of House of Ashur, Achillia kills Ammonius, Proculus's champion, during the primus honoring the House of Ashur, but she is injured to the hand during the fight. When his medicus insists to amputate Achillia's hand, Ashur throws him off the ludus's cliff. During the recovering of Achillia, Ashur names Tarchon as the temporary champion of House of Ashur. He learns that Opiter, a lanista of Capua, and Korris are lovers and that they want to go in Sicilia. Opiter offers him his entire ludus in exchange for Korris to go with him peacefully. First reluctant, Ashur finally accepts. But they discover Opiter and his entire household murdered, apparently by the Cilician pirates. Ashur will try to ally with Cornelia to win Opiter's ludus at auction but when she will learn by Cossutia that it is because of him that Gabinius refused the marriage of Viridia with Quintus Thermus, Caesar's ally, she revokes her support and Proculus will win Opiter's ludus. Seeing Satyrus with the pendant that he had offer to his lover, Korris will understand that the Ferox Brothers are Opiter's murderers. Ashur will stop him, but will be agree to help him to avenge. One night, whereas he makes love with Hilara, Ashur will hallucinate as seeing Viridia, showing that he falls in love with her. Soon after, Ashur is ambushed in the arena by the Ferox Brothers and four others gladiators of Proculus. But Ashur smiles revealing that he is accompanied by five of his gladiators, and whereas they prepare to fight, Korris appears. He wants to fight the Ferox Brothers and the others alone to avenge Opiter. Korris kills easily three gladiators of Proculus, the fourth is killed by Ashur whereas he tries to flee. Satyrus fights Korris with his brothers, but Korris proves to be more powerful as he kills Musicus and Balbus and defeats easily the last of Ferox Brothers. Korris prepares to finish Satyrus but finally leaves him alive to deliver a message to Proculus. Ashur welcomes again Korris as his Doctore. After Tarchon reinjures Achillia to her hand, Ashur retires him the title of champion. Celadus will be chosen as the new temporary champion but he will be killed by the Scythian Gladiatrix, new champion of Proculus, and Ashur will be devastated when Viridia will reveal him that she is promised to Pompey to stop him to ally with Crassus and Caesar. Ashur will be ordered by Caesar and Cornelia to kill Gabinius to disrupt the union of Viridia and Pompey. Ashur refuses but Caesar says him that if the wedding is maintained, Crassus will retire him his support. Ashur makes a plan with Achillia, Hilara and Messia. Pompey is drugged and disgraced by Gabinius when he surprises him with Achillia. Furious, Gabinius disrupts the union and abandons Pompey to support Crassus, but Pompey still in a drug haze gravely wounds Gabinius and Ashur is forced to smother him after Gabinius dying discovered his role in this plot. Ashur will come to support Viridia but Servius, brother of Gabinius and uncle of Viridia, will chase him but Viridia will kiss him before he leaves. Servius excludes all of Ashur's gladiators except Achillia for the primus, replacing them by the gladiators of Pompeii. But Achillia will kill the Scythian Gladiatrix after a fierce fight, giving the victory of House of Ashur. Ashur will kiss Hilara and will see Viridia, saddened to be away from her. After the games to honor Gabinius, Caesar prepares to leave. Ashur asks him when the new arena will begin construction but Caesar tells him that Crassus has decided to use the funds to build new villas instead, despite their agreement. An enraged Ashur attacks Caesar, slashes his two guards and after a long fight Ashur kills Caesar.

=== Naevia ===
- Portrayed by Lesley-Ann Brandt (Prequel and Season 1), Cynthia Addai-Robinson (Season 2 and 3)

Lucretia's personal and loyal slave. She becomes Crixus' love interest after he declares his affection. The two are seen by Ashur making love, and in attempt to gain vengeance on Crixus for crippling him, he asks for Naevia's purity from Batiatus. Naevia refuses to be with Crixus again and reveals to him that Batiatus has given her to another man. Though she refuses to mention who, Crixus finds out it is Ashur during an exhibition fight between Glaber's soldiers and Spartacus. He attacks Ashur in a fit of rage, revealing their affair to all. She is punished (beaten as well as her hair cut) and sold after this, and Crixus vows to find her. After the rebellion, he sets out to seek information about her whereabouts, and eventually finds her in the deepest mines of Rome, taking her back with him. While she was sold from master to master, it's revealed some of them had done unspeakable things to her, and this forces Crixus to teach her how to fight like a warrior, so that no man will ever hurt her again. She becomes a strong warrior, having no difficulties defeating and killing many Roman soldiers. However, haunted by her past mistreatment at the hands of the Romans, Naevia develops a severe hatred toward anyone of Roman descent, be they soldiers or civilians. Her hatred causes a large rift between the major generals of the rebel army, particularly Spartacus, as well as Gannicus, after they refuse to kill the unarmed Roman families who were in a city they had taken. Eventually convincing Crixus to separate from Spartacus to take further vengeance. The two of them, as well as the several thousand who followed them, begin marching toward the city of Rome itself, winning many skirmishes along the way. Just a few miles outside the city, they are cornered by Crassus' vastly larger army, and thus soundly defeated. She is forced to watch as Crixus is beheaded by Tiberius. Naevia, however, is spared and sent back to the rebel camp carrying Crixus' severed head as warning of Spartacus' demise. Games are held pitting Roman soldiers against gladiators in honor of Crixus, with Naevia to face a now captive Tiberius in the primus. Begrudgingly, sparing him for the purpose of trading him in order to regain 500 of the slaved defeated in battle, she later helps Spartacus prepare for the final battle against Crassus. While aiding Gannicus in protecting their flank, Naevia is severely wounded after a horseback rider slashes her jugular vein. Despite the fatal injury, she still attempts to engage Caesar, though she is swiftly bested. Forced to her knees from a slash to her kneecap, she is then stabbed in the neck, and through the heart (mirroring the manner in which Diona was killed) with her own sword.

=== Mira ===
- Portrayed by Katrina Law.

Mira is one of Lucretia's house servants, who uses her to seduce Spartacus in order to ensure that he can perform sexually for her friend, Licinia; but Spartacus turns down her advances. Later, Mira develops genuine romantic feelings towards Spartacus and becomes his lover, and aids him in the rebellion by opening the gates to the villa. In season 2, Mira continues to aid Spartacus, becoming a skilled archer and warrior in her own right. Despite his affection for her, she realizes that she ultimately cannot replace Spartacus' wife, Sura. Spartacus loses trust in her when she tries to murder the captured Ilithyia. While trapped on Mt Vesuvius, Mira helps Spartacus rescue a group of rebels attempting to escape the surrounding Roman forces and is struck by an axe, launched by Salvius, Glaber's new second-in-command. She dies in Spartacus' arms and Spartacus is devastated by her death.

=== Gaius Claudius Glaber ===
- Portrayed by Craig Parker.

Husband of Ilithyia. A Roman army legatus who is responsible for Spartacus' enslavement as a gladiator. Glaber requested the aid of Spartacus' tribe of Thracians in return for Roman aid against their enemies. When Glaber's interests changed, the Thracians rebelled and Glaber put down the insurrection. He then sold Spartacus' wife Sura to a Syrian slave trader and sentenced Spartacus to death in the arena. When Spartacus defeats his opponents, he reluctantly sells Spartacus to the ludus of Batiatus. Many months later, after it is revealed to him that his wife murdered Licinia, the cousin of Marcus Crassus, he is forced to grant Batiatus patronage in his quest to gain political station. In Vengeance, he becomes praetor and is tasked by the Senate with ending the rebellion. He vows to find Spartacus and bring him to his knees, whatever the cost. He resorts to ever more murderous tactics to secure this goal; murdering Seppius to gain control of his men and enlisting Ashur to recruit former gladiators as a personal hit squad. His marriage to Ilithyia becomes strained and is unaware that the child she carries is not his. He is devastated when he discovers she plans to dissolve their marriage and abort their child. He ruins these plans when he kills her father, Albinius. After she is taken by Gannicus and thought to be dead, Glaber begins an affair with Seppia. When Spartacus offers to trade Ilithyia for weapons and armor, Glaber refuses the deal, essentially condemning his wife. Despite this, Ilithyia returns and saves Glaber from Seppia, who planned on killing him after she discovered he murdered her brother. Glaber and Ilithyia then reunite. Glaber finally tracks Spartacus to Mt Vesuvius and traps them on the mountain, intending to starve them out. Spartacus and his followers escape the mountaintop and began bombarding the Roman army with his own siege equipment. During the battle, Spartacus and Glaber fight once more with Spartacus finally slaying his hated foe by stabbing him through the chest, then ramming his blade down his throat.

=== Ilithyia ===
- Portrayed by Viva Bianca.

The daughter of senator Albinius and wife of Glaber and another one of the series antagonists. She hates Spartacus for embarrassing her husband and forms a close friendship with Lucretia, frequently visiting the ludus. Her interest in the ludus impels her to purchase her own gladiator, Segovax, whom she pressures to kill Spartacus. The attempt is unsuccessful and Segovax is crucified, though her involvement is not proven. An arrangement where Ilithyia has sex with Crixus is set up, but a jealous Lucretia instead has a masked Ilithyia lay with a masked Spartacus. Licinia, cousin of Marcus Crassus, and Lucretia interrupt, causing Ilithyia to kill Licinia. Ilithyia then seduces the boy Numerius into having Varro, Spartacus's only friend, put to death by Spartacus. A petty and cowardly woman, Ilithyia escapes during the revolt but unregretfully causes the death of many friends by ordering the doors lockers to prevent anyone escaping as the rebels go on a murderous rampage through the ludus. In Vengeance, she falls pregnant, the father initially assumed to be Glaber. After being forced to return to Capua while her husband hunts Spartacus, she reunites with Lucretia and they slowly become friends again. When Glaber neglects her, she plans to dissolve her marriage to Glaber and become Varinius' wife. This plan is ruined when her father is killed. Glaber then turns from her. When she is kidnapped by Gannicus, Glaber begins an affair with Seppia and does not honor a deal with Spartacus for Ilithyia's release. Spartacus is briefly tempted to kill her for all the misery she caused him, but she avoids this by revealing the child she carries is his, not Glaber's. Ilithyia later returns after Spartacus lets her go, and kills Seppia, who was about to kill Glaber. They then reunite, bonded by vengeance and his ambition to gain power in Rome. But after Glaber tells her to kill Lucretia, Ilithyia is about to do so when her water breaks. Lucretia, revealing that all along she has been madly set on bringing a child at last to her husband, kills the servants, cuts the baby from her womb and falls over the cliff with it. Ilithyia, who had crawled out to stop Lucretia, bears witness to this and then dies from shock and blood loss.

=== Agron ===
- Portrayed by Dan Feuerriegel.

A German slave, who was sold to the house of Batiatus along with his younger brother Duro. After Varro's death, both Agron and his brother take over as Spartacus' main training partners. Agron and his brother are the first to join Spartacus in his plan to rebel and take back their freedom. When the plan is set in motion and the slave revolt starts, Agron fights by Spartacus' side and slays many guards. He is overcome with rage when his brother is murdered during the revolt, and vows to avenge his death. He joins Spartacus when they escape the ludus, and becomes his right hand as they take on Roman guards that have been sent after them. He and Spartacus go their own ways when it's revealed that Agron lied about Naevia's supposed death, as he did not wish to see many men (especially Spartacus) die in the search for one single person. He and others set foot to Vesuvius, where they reunite with Spartacus again later, who has found Neavia. Agron later becomes the lover of Nasir, a young slave whom he supervised after he was rescued from his fate after Spartacus and the rebels kill his master. Agron continues to fight by Spartacus' side, but his relationship with Nasir becomes unstable when a pirate named Castus shows interest in Nasir. Although Agron and Nasir eventually work out their problems, they are separated when Agron decides to join Crixus in his plan to take the city of Rome (believing that a peaceful life was not meant for him), while asking Nasir to remain with Spartacus, as he knows Spartacus and his group will have a better chance of surviving. Crixus' army is defeated by the Romans, but several are captured alive; and Agron, refusing to give up Spartacus' location, is crucified. Gaius Julius Caesar, however, makes a deal with Spartacus; he will return Spartacus' people who have been captured, in return for Kore (a former slave of Crassus whom he loved deeply). Thus, Agron is returned to the rebels, and reunited with Nasir.

As the rebels prepare for the final battle, it is revealed that Agron’s hands are still damaged from his crucifixion; and he can't hold a sword properly until they fully heal, much to Agron's frustration and impatience. Nasir, however, crafts him a shield with a sword attached to it, allowing Agron to participate after all despite being originally ordered not to by Spartacus. During the finale battle, Agron slays many Romans and ultimately comes to Spartacus' aid when he is mortally wounded. He brings Spartacus to the foot of the mountain, where he eventually dies in a distraught Agron's arms. They have also received word that some of the rebels who set foot to the mountain before the battle began had been captured or killed by the Romans. In the end, Agron and Nasir are two of few warriors to survive, and lead the remaining non-combatant slaves to a new life. This makes Agron one of only a few gladiators from Batiatus' ludus, as well as the only prominent one from the first season, to have survived the rebellion.

=== Gannicus ===
- Portrayed by Dustin Clare.

A Celt slave who becomes Quintus' first champion, a position left vacant by the grave injury suffered by Gannicus' close friend Oenomaus at the hands of Theokoles. In an effort to win favor with Quintillius Varis, a man of much influence who is in Capua selecting gladiators for his games, Lucretia invites Varis to the ludus to get better acquainted with the Batiatus gladiators. During the visit, a depraved Varis requests to see Gannicus in action, and Gannicus is forced to have sex with Lucretia's personal slave and Oenomaus' wife, Melitta. Neither Gannicus nor Melitta enjoy having to perform for the Romans, and their relationship with each other and Oenomaus becomes strained (though Oenomaus is unaware of what has happened). Meanwhile, Gannicus' flashy style and cavalier attitude gain him much favor with the spectators and Quintus, but are met with indignation by Titus Batiatus upon the pater familias' return to the ludus. Titus, feeling pressure to mend social and political relationships scarred by Quintus' actions, agrees to sell Gannicus to Tullius. Before Gannicus can be sold, Lucretia poisons Titus and Melitta (by accident), killing both and framing Tullius. Now that Quintus is head of the household, he decides to keep Gannicus and gain revenge on Tullius. Quintus finally regains the social standing his father willingly parted with, and manages to enter his men into the opening games of the Capua arena. The winners of each round meet in the Primus, and Gannicus wins after defeating Solonius' best gladiators. In an act of betrayal, Solonius convinces Varis to award Gannicus his freedom, thereby robbing the house of Batiatus of their only proven champion. Gannicus returns to Capua during the events of Vengeance after being hired to execute the captured rebels in the arena. After Spartacus's attack on the arena, he helps the rebels get the wounded Oenomaus to safety. Despite pleas to join their cause, he returns to Capua and Glaber tries to force him to join his army against the rebels. In response, Gannicus kidnaps Ilithyia and delivers her to Spartacus, thinking that if Spartacus kills the woman of the man who killed his, the rebellion will end with no more bloodshed. However, Spartacus spares her and Gannicus, having given up everything, is forced to stay with the rebels. While cynical of Spartacus' cause at first, he is won over with the help of Oenomaus, who has forgiven Gannicus for his forced relationship with Melitta, and serves a vital role in the rebellion. After the rebels gain several thousand more freed slaves, Spartacus tries to groom Gannicus to become a leader, which Gannicus refuses time and time again. He is involved in a relationship with Saxa, but ultimately leaves her for Sibyl, a young slave he helped free after taking over the city of Sinuessa en Valle. When Crixus chooses to separate from Spartacus and march on Rome for revenge, Crixus tries to persuade Gannicus to join him and his men telling him that it would be a blessing to them all if he did; but Gannicus declines, opting instead to stick with Spartacus and take the path over the alps to freedom with Sibyl. Crixus understands and they bid goodbye, reaffirming their brotherhood.

Hours before the final battle, Gannicus finally agrees to become a leader, so that the rebels may have a better chance. He approaches Crassus' army from behind with his own group, distracting him from Spartacus. Gannicus easily slays many Romans, and is horrified to see both Saxa and Naevia die in front of him. He is ultimately cornered by the Romans, and captured by Caesar. Gannicus is then crucified along with thousands of other rebels. In his final moments, Gannicus sees his old friend Oenomaus, and imagines being back in the arena again, with everyone cheering his name.

=== Gaius Julius Caesar ===
- Portrayed by Todd Lasance; Jackson Gallagher

A younger version of famous Roman dictator Gaius Julius Caesar. Serves as Tribune in Crassus' army. Caesar's participation in this series is entirely fictional as there is no record of Caesar's involvement in the Third Servile War, although Caesar was indeed Tribune under Crassus at the time. Caesar is sent to Sinuessa en Valle to pose as a rebel slave and help bring the rebels down from the inside. After manipulating Nemetes and his followers, he kills them when they go too far with their actions. He is ultimately successful and rejoins Crassus after the surviving rebels flee into the mountains. He loathes Tiberius and battles him for Crassus attention and favor. He becomes aware of Kore's rape by Tiberius and schemes to have Crassus made aware of the act, however Tiberius outmaneuvers and eludes him at almost every turn. He is nearly killed by Crixus before the gladiator is ambushed from behind by Tiberius in an attempt to steal glory; much to Caesar's anger, and is forced to watch as his adversary is executed. Caesar is further infuriated when Canthara, a slave whom he was taking care of, is murdered by Tiberius just to spite him (and because she held knowledge of Tiberius' rape of Kore). He manipulates Tiberius's capture by the rebels, but is then forced to negotiate his release. In the final battle, he kills a dying Naevia and is almost bested by Gannicus before the rebel is overwhelmed by the number of Roman soldiers. He shares Crassus' victory in the end and reluctantly allows Pompey to usurp them.

In House of Ashur, Caesar arrives to Capua with his wife Cornelia, instead of Crassus, take over Ashur's villa and sleep with Ashur's lovers, Hilara and Messia to assert their dominance over him. Caesar reveals to Ashur that he and Crassus have orchestrated the Cilician Pirates on Cossutia and Viridia so he could obtain the favors of Gabinius who supports Pompey. After House of Ashur's victory in the arena, Caesar informs Ashur that he is forced to leave early to meet Pompey but Cornelia will stay behind. Later, Caesar returns to Capua, furious against Ashur who prevented the wedding of Viridia with Quintus Thermus. He orders him to kill Gabinius to interrupt the wedding of Viridia with Pompey. Ashur refuses but Caesar says him that if the wedding is maintained, Crassus will retire him his support. Ashur makes a plan with Achillia, Hilara and Messia. Pompey is drugged and disgraced by Gabinius when he surprises him with Achillia. Furious, Gabinius disrupts the union and abandons Pompey to support Crassus, but Pompey still in a drug haze gravely wounds Gabinius and Ashur is forced to smother him after Gabinius dying discovered his role in this plot. After the games to honor Gabinius, Caesar prepares to leave. Ashur asks him when the new arena will begin construction but Caesar tells him that Crassus has decided to use the funds to build new villas instead, despite their agreement. An enraged Ashur attacks Caesar, and after a long fight Ashur kills Caesar.

=== Marcus Licinius Crassus ===
- Portrayed by Simon Merrells

The main antagonist of War of the Damned; the richest man in Rome and a senator of the Republic tasked with bringing end to the rebellion. He is shown to be a skilled military strategist, manipulator and warrior. He is also shown to have significant disdain for the Roman elite who, despite his wealth, sneer at his lack of name. After being asked by the Senate to finance an army to take down the rebels, he is forced to share leadership. He artfully (and secretly) organizes the deaths of the other commanders and is given sole command. He takes his slave Kore as a lover and shows her great affection, even asking her to accompany him while he engages Spartacus and is devastated when she joins the rebellion to escape his son. Despite the harsh treatment he shows his son Tiberius after his defeat, he loves him and pushes him to succeed. Crassus shows great admiration for Spartacus, despite their opposing sides; and appears truly distraught when Spartacus is ambushed from behind by his dishonorable men, robbing Crassus the honor of killing him in fair contest. Despite his victory over Spartacus and his army, Crassus glory is stolen by Pompey; but it takes this in good stride, knowing that with Pompey as an ally, he and Caesar will form a powerful force in Rome.

In House of Ashur, Crassus is in conflict with Pompey, their quarrel risks to cause a civil war.

=== Tiberius Licinius Crassus ===
- Portrayed by Christian Antidormi

The fictional son of Crassus who is desirous of his father's approval, which leads to him suffering an early defeat and losing his father's respect. After being forced to kill his best friend Sabinus, he rapes his father's slave lover Kore as revenge and secretly hopes to overthrow his father to take over. He becomes aggressively ambitious and a rival with Caesar for Crassus' attention. He kills Crixus while the former gladiator is distracted by Caesar. He is later captured by Spartacus and sentenced to be killed by Naevia. However, he is traded back to Crassus for 500 rebels captured when Crixus fell. Before this can happen, he is killed by a vengeful Kore.

== Recurring characters ==
=== Blood and Sand ===
==== House of Batiatus ====
- Aulus (Mark Mitchinson). Batiatus' hitman. He retrieves Sura on Batiatus' orders and murders her. He is choked to death by Spartacus once he learns that Aulus killed Sura under Batiatus' orders.
- Aurelia (Brooke Williams). Free Roman wife of Varro. Attempting to take care of their child after Varro sells himself as a gladiator, she is raped by an acquaintance. When Varro spurns her afterwards, she murders the rapist and they reconcile. After Varro's death at Spartacus' hand, she aborts the rapist's child and sells herself into slavery to see their child provided for. Seeking revenge upon Spartacus, she learns that the death was not his doing, but that of Numerius. During the rebellion, she kills the young Roman, while screaming for Varro. Spartacus later gives her a chance to flee Capua to start a new life, but she is captured and tortured. She dies desiring that Spartacus and the rebellion stay away from her family.
- Euclid (Nigel Willoughby). A slave who serves as cook for the gladiators at Batiatus' Ludus and later for the Rebels. He is one of the few slaves who manage to survive to flee over the mountains to true freedom.
- Barca (Antonio Te Maioha). Nicknamed the "Beast of Carthage", he is one of Batiatus' most successful gladiators. He served as bodyguard and hit man for his master. Barca attempted to save up enough money to buy freedom for himself and his lover, Pietros. However, due to Ashur's machinations to avoid paying Barca money owed from losing a bet, questions regarding the latest murder committed on the part of Batiatus arise, resulting in Batiatus luring Barca into an ambush and murdering him.
- Duro (Ande Cunningham). Younger brother of Agron. Clearly not as proficient a fighter as Agron, he is often saved in combat by him. In the slave revolt, he pushes Agron out of the way of an attacking guard and is mortally wounded in his place. He dies in Agron's arms saying : "This time, it's me who saves you, brother".
- Gnaeus (Raicho Vasilev). A Dacian gladiator who fights in the unconventional retiarius style. Killed by Spartacus after Gnaeus's abuses led to Pietros's suicide.
- Hamilcar (Siaosi Fonua). A Sardinian gladiator, killed during the revolt.
- Hector (Tim Foley). A guard. Naevia steals his gate key to lay with Crixus. While harassing Mira about the key, Spartacus scars his face by pushing it into a burning lantern. After Batiatus discovers he was the one who lost his key, he is beheaded.
- Kerza (Karlos Drinkwater). A captured fugitive who is forced to become a gladiator. He is killed in the Pits by Ixion.
- Leviticus (Levi Holley). A Judean gladiator. Later a prominent rebel. He survives the final battle and escapes the battlefield as one of the few slaves to survive to flee over the mountains to true freedom.
- Ortius (Fortune Shumba). A Numidian gladiator. Later a prominent rebel. Is slain by the army of Crassus during Crixus' attempt to lay siege on Rome.
- Pietros (Eka Darville). Lover of Barca and slave of Batiatus. He dreams of freedom with Barca once enough money has been earned to buy their freedom. However, after Barca's demise, Pietros is left without a protector. Gnaeus soon begins raping and beating Pietros, leading Pietros to hang himself.
- Pollux (Graham Vincent). A Numidian gladiator. Later a prominent rebel. He survives the final battle and escapes the battlefield as one of the few slaves to survive to flee over the mountains to true freedom.
- Rabanus (Andrew Stehlin). A Sardinian gladiator. Later a prominent rebel. His fate is unknown after the final battle, but it's possible he might have survived and escaped along with the others who made it to the mountains to true freedom.
- Rhaskos (Ioane King). A Gaul gladiator who admires Crixus and gladly joins the revolt after seeing Crixus launch Spartacus into the balcony. He is among those captured during their attempt to rescue Naevia from the mines and falls in the arena, killed by Mycter, before Spartacus is able to launch his rescue attempt.
- Segovax (Mike Edward). A Gaul slave purchased by Batiatus to become a gladiator. He fights under Ilithyia, who has him attempt to kill Spartacus in exchange of freedom. He is stopped by Crixus, and later emasculated and crucified by his fellow gladiators on Batiatus' orders.
- The Veteran (Shayne Blaikie). An unnamed Greek gladiator. Later a prominent rebel. He survives the final battle and escapes the battlefield as one of the few slaves to survive to flee over the mountains to true freedom.
- Tyronius (Tyrone Bell). A Gaul Gladiator. Later a prominent rebel. He is one of the few slaves who manage to survive to flee over the mountains to true freedom.
- Varro (Jai Courtney). A Roman citizen who sold himself to the ludus to support his family, also a good friend of Spartacus. Varro is killed when Numerius forces Spartacus to kill him after a duel that was simply for show. He left behind a son and a pregnant wife, Aurelia, who was raped by one of his old friends.

==== Other gladiators ====
- Anubis (Marcus Johnson II). The editor of the games held in The Pits of The Underworld in season 1.
- Ixion (Campbell Cooley). Fierce warrior who fights in The Pits. He wears the severed faces of his killed foes. He is responsible for Kerza's death, and meets his own end when Spartacus kills him with his own axe.
- Pericles (Thomas Kiwi). The Champion of Pompeii. Killed by Crixus in the Pompeii Games.
- Theokoles (Reuben De Jong). An albino Spartan towering above all of his opponents (the actor who plays him stands 6' 10"). He was undefeated and had previously defeated as many as 100 men in a single spectacle. He has won many fortunes and his freedom several times, but continues to fight high-profile matches. Immensely strong and impervious to pain, Theokoles was unbeaten prior to the Shadow Games episode. Oenomaus, who is the only man to survive a battle with Theokoles (and still bears the scars of the match), personally trains Spartacus and Crixus for the spectacle. Theokoles meets his end during a match between himself, Crixus and Spartacus, the former's aid allowing Spartacus to become the victor.

==== Other characters ====
- Aemilia (Mia Pistorius). Friend and follower of Licinia and Ilithyia, murdered during the revolt.
- Albinius (Kevin J. Wilson). A Roman senator and Ilithyia's father. He is killed by Glaber in Spartacus: Vengeance.
- Caecilia (Tania Nolan). Friend and follower of Licinia and Ilithyia. Murdered off-screen during the revolt.
- Domitia (Janine Burchett). The wife of magistrate Calavius and mother of Numerius. She is slain during the rebellion.
- Iovis (Josh Randall). Glaber's toughest guard/soldier. Killed by Oenomaus during the revolt.
- Licinia (Brooke Harman) (credited as Brooke Harmon). A rich Roman noblewoman and cousin of Marcus Licinius Crassus, a Roman senator. She is a friend of Ilithyia and visits Lucretia, asking to partake of the pleasures of the ludus, i.e. a sexual encounter with a gladiator. She asks for Spartacus by name, being attracted to him. When she and Lucretia discover Ilithyia having sex with Spartacus, she wonders at the tale of the wife of Glaber sleeping with his most hated enemy. Enraged, Ilithyia kills Licinia. Licinia's murder is used by Batiatus to extort patronage from the legatus.
- Marcus Decius Solonius (Craig Walsh-Wrightson). A Capuan lanista and rival of Batiatus. It is shown in Gods of the Arena that he and Batiatus were close friends, but became enemies by the season finale. He tries to bring down Batiatus, but is ultimately caught in the webs of Batiatus and condemned to die in the arena, being framed for the murder of magistrate Calavius. He is slain by Spartacus, but not before the gladiator informs him that Batiatus and his entire house will follow Solonius to the underworld. Solonius dies laughing to the roar of the crowd.
- Mercato (Greg Ward). A Roman politician and grandson of Marcus Minucius Rufus, a famous conqueror of the Thracians. Although the original character's name was Erebus, the name was changed to Mercato prior to filming. He is present at most of the games at the arena and is killed when the pulvinus collapses on top of him.
- Numerius Calavius (Lliam Powell). The son of magistrate Calavius with a fascination for gladiators, Spartacus in particular. Seduced by Ilithyia, he orders the death of Varro to please her. During the rebellion, he is killed by a vengeful Aurelia, wife of Varro.
- Ovidius (Matthew Chamberlain). A Capuan businessman to whom Batiatus owes money. After attempting to have Batiatus killed, he and his family are killed in revenge. He is Titus Calavius' cousin.
- Pompeii Magistrate (Philip Grieve).
- Ramel (Jon Brazier). A Capuan merchant of jewels. He sells Lucretia an expensive emerald necklace, but will only accept half the price when she attempts to return it.
- Sextus (Andrew Laing). Husband of Aemilia. Killed by Spartacus at the beginning of the revolt after Batiatus shields himself. Revealed in Vengeance to be the cousin of Seppius and Seppia.
- Sura (Erin Cummings). The wife of Spartacus. She is enslaved after her husband rebels against the Romans. Batiatus purchases her, but has Aulus murder her in order to break Spartacus' desire for escape. She appears to Spartacus through dreams and visions and encourages his quest for vengeance.
- Titus Calavius (John Bach). Magistrate of Capua. He and his family become close to Batiatus but when Batiatus expresses interest in pursuing politics, he insults Batiatus, leading to a scheme where he is murdered in the sewers beneath Capua. The murder is then pinned on Solonius.

=== Gods of the Arena ===
==== Romans ====
- Gaia (Jaime Murray) - A Roman social climber; a close friend of Lucretia. She is struck by a concrete statue and murdered by Tullius during a party hosted by Lucretia in an attempt to gain the favor of the Capuan elite. Despite Lucretia's protest, Titus has Gaia's body and belongings hurled over the cliff to make her murder look like an accident.
- Quintilius Varus (Peter Feeney) - A Roman senator visiting Capua for business with involving the games. A close friend of Gaia and her late husband, he is drawn to Batiatus' ludus before Vettius can draw him in and becomes impressed by Gannicus into choosing Batiatus for the games.
- Titus Batiatus (Jeffrey Thomas) - Father of Quintus who disapproves of his son's efforts to gain power. He is slowly poisoned and eventually killed by Lucretia in order to prevent him from disowning her and his son Batiatus.
- Tullius (Stephen Lovatt) - A very rich and influential Roman and enemy of Batiatus. Tullius is responsible for the construction of the grand arena in Capua (seen in both seasons 1 and 2). Lucretia frames him for the deaths of Titus Batiatus and Melitta. He is stabbed and eventually sealed alive within the walls of the very arena he built by Batiatus and his group of vengeful gladiators.
- Vettius (Gareth Williams) - A rival lanista to both Batiatus and Solonius. Young, arrogant and short tempered, he holds a close business relationship with Tullius virtually allowing him full control of his ludus. When Tullius is bricked into the walls of the arena by Batiatus, Solonius blackmails Vettius into surrendering his Ludus over to him as well as leaving Capua forever.
- Cossutius (Jason Hood) - a wealthy man who lives outside of Capua and is easily the most depraved character in the entire series. He is impaled through the chest and killed by a javelin thrown by Spartacus during his attack on the arena.

==== Slaves ====
- Auctus (Josef Brown) - A Greek gladiator. A lover of Barca with whom he shares a penchant for hazing new gladiators. He is killed by Crixus during their match in the old arena.
- Dagan (Shane Rangi) - A Syrian slave and Ashur's comrade. He does not speak the Roman tongue and requires Ashur to translate, often being duped in the process. Despite earning the mark of the brotherhood without fighting a seasoned gladiator, he proves himself in the arena and earns their respect, unlike Ashur. He is tricked into being used for sex by a Roman during a party, after which he turns on Ashur. His future as a gladiator is ruined after Ashur blinds him in one eye. In the opening games of the arena, he makes it to the primus and attempts to kill Ashur. However, Ashur outwits, defeats and kills him.
- Diona (Jessica Grace Smith) - A servant in the house of Batiatus. A close friend of Naevia. After being chosen as a sex slave by Cossutius and repeatedly raped thereafter for Roman entertainment, she changes from a spirited youth to a broken and bitter woman. Not wishing to see her friend further deteriorate, Naevia aids in Diona's escape from the Ludus. She is later caught and executed with other fugitive slaves prior to the opening games of the new arena, leaving Neavia to bear witness to her demise.
- Indus (Steven A. Davis) - A Macedonian slave and recruit for the House of Batiatus. Is nearly sent to the mines for his lack of skill, but is then selected along with the Syrians (Ashur and Dagan) to help Batiatus in a plot to take opportunity away from rival lanista Vettius in exchange for being inducted into the brotherhood despite not taking the test. Though they succeed, Ashur is reluctantly forced to kill Indus since Vettius had seen his face (one thing Batiatus ordered not to happen) and could recognize him as a slave of Batiatus later.
- Lydon (Renato Gomes) - A Hispanic gladiator. Later a prominent rebel. He survives the final battle and escapes the battlefield as one of the few slaves to survive to flee over the mountains to true freedom.
- Melitta (Marisa Ramirez) - Wife of Oenamaus. She was Lucretia's trusted body slave prior to Naevia's tenure. Immensely popular among both her fellow slaves as well as her masters, Melitta was often allowed to speak freely among her masters without being prompted, a punishable offense under any other circumstance. She is eventually forced to sleep with Gannicus, a dear friend to both her and Oenamaus, in order to entertain Senator Varrus and earn Gannicus a place in his Primus (the main event of the arena games). Consequently, she begins developing feelings for Gannicus despite her constant denial. She is accidentally killed by Lucretia when she drinks poisoned wine meant for Titus, and dies a rather violent death in Gannicus's arms.
- Ulpius (Temuera Morrison) - The former Doctore of the ludus. Ulpius is an adherent of tradition and disapproves of Batiatus' methods of furthering the ludus such as fighting in the street, giving recruits the mark without taking the final test, and using Barca as a bodyguard. Batiatus eventually informs Ulpius of his plans to replace him with his student Oenamaus. Ulpius forces Oenamaus to fight him in a fit of jealousy, despite the other's reluctance, and he is eventually killed by his replacement.

=== Vengeance ===
==== Rebels ====
- Chadara (Bonnie Sveen) - a freed Greek slave from the same house as Nasir. First having inclinations to Spartacus, she seduces Rhaskos to secure her position among the rebels and struggles to find a new protector after he is killed. She then steals the rebels' map and coin and attempts to give them up to the Romans. Mira accidentally kills her when she tries to flee.
- Donar (Heath Jones) - a German rebel; originally a gladiator from the House of Batiatus and often shown following Spartacus or Agron. After the fall of Sinuessa to the Romans, he is captured and sentenced to be executed by Caesar. His chains are secretly unlocked by Tiberius and he engages Caesar. He is eventually defeated but impales himself on his sword to rob Caesar of the honor of killing him. Crassus later mounts his crucified body in a tent upon the ravine as a taunt to the rebels.
- Harudes (Carl Grace) - a Germanic slave rescued from the Roman slave ship. A reckless brute with no proper consideration, he only knows his native tongue. He is captured by Glaber's followers before being executed by the man himself for refusing to cooperate with the interrogation as speaking in his native tongue.
- Lugo (Barry Duffield) - a Germanic slave rescued by the rebels from a Roman slave ship. He is the first to swear loyalty to Spartacus and is shown to be merry and liked by all. He is killed in the final battle against Crassus.
- Lysandros (Michael Surman) - a Greek slave originally serving under the House of Batiatus. He survives the final battle and escapes the battlefield as one of the few slaves to survive to flee over the mountains to true freedom.
- Nasir (Pana Hema Taylor) - a Syrian rebel and the lover of Agron. He is at first angry after the murder of his master due to his loss of position. He tries to murder Spartacus in revenge but Spartacus spares his life. He later becomes one of Spartacus' most loyal soldiers and escapes over the mountains with Agron and over hundreds of other slaves.
- Nemetes (Ditch Davey). A Germanic slave among those rescued from a Roman slave ship. He is in a relationship with Saxa, until she leaves him for Gannicus. He is indirectly responsible of Mira's death when he leads a group of rebels against Glaber's troops. A greedy man, he has taken to acquiring all the coin he can while in Sinuessa en Valle and is furious when Spartacus confiscates it to pay the pirate Heracleo. He becomes friends with Caesar while the Roman is posing as a rebel. When Caesar reveals himself, he attempts to turn on Spartacus to save his own life but Caesar kills him regardless, to his surprise and horror.
- Saxa (Ellen Hollman) - a German slave rescued by the rebels from the Roman slave ship. Violent and bloodthirsty, she is known for leaping on her opponents and stabbing them with knives. She later becomes Gannicus' lover as well as to the slave Belesa until Gannicus leaves her for Sibyl. She is killed in the final battle with the legions of Crassus and dies in Gannicus' arms.
- Sedullus (Conan Stevens). a Germanic slave rescued from the Roman slave ship. He is dismissive of Spartacus and his rules as well as jealous of Agron for being the one the other Germanics turn to most, preferring to be leader and enjoy his newfound freedom. He attempts to rape Naevia and is attacked by Agron, Crixus and Spartacus. Spartacus kills him and the remaining German rebels agree to follow Spartacus.
- Totus (James Wells) - a Germanic slave rescued from the Roman slave ship. Like Lugo, he is shown to be merry and easy to get along with. He is killed by Tiberius when protecting the rebels' hold in Sinuessa en Valle.
- Thessela (Sarah Holder) - Ilithyia's body slave; crucified by Roman Soldiers, on the orders of Glaber to spite his wife.
- Amana (Nicola Simpson) - Ilithyia's new body slave; bought during the period where Glaber was legatus and became praetor. After Thessela was falsely accused to support Spartacus and his rebels, she was killed by Glaber and Ashur's mercenaries to make suffer Ilithyia. Amana will look powerless her death. She will become the personal Ilithyia's body slave. Amana will be killed by Lucretia when she will take her revenge on Ilithyia.

==== Romans ====
- Lucius Caelius (Peter McCauley) - A Roman man, whose home and family were destroyed during Sulla's rebellion years earlier. He aids Spartacus and his rebels by allowing them to stay in his temple and trains them in the use of the bow. When Spartacus attempts to trade Ilithyia for weapons, Glaber ambushes them and Lucius is slain by The Egyptian.
- Seppius (Tom Hobbs) - a young Capua citizen of note and brother of Seppia. An ally of Publius Varinius, he wishes to strip the honor of capturing Spartacus from Glaber. He is jealously protective of his sister and considers turning on Varinius after witnessing the praetor flirt with her. Glaber organises his murder in order to add Seppius' soldiers to his own army and makes it appear he was killed by his own slaves.
- Seppia (Hanna Mangan-Lawrence) - the younger sister of Seppius. She attempts to secure Varinius as a husband until humiliated by Ilithyia for her inability to torture a captured rebel. After her brother is murdered, she moves in with Glaber and Ilithyia. When Ilithyia is captured by Gannicus, she seduces Glaber and becomes his lover. Lucretia tells Seppia the truth about her brother's murder and Seppia tries to kill Glaber. Glaber is saved by Ilithyia, who kills Seppia.
- Publius Varinius (Brett Tucker) - Glaber's chief political rival and fellow praetor. He is the target of the romantic desires of both Seppia and Ilithyia. Ilithyia and her father try to dissolve her marriage to Glaber so she may marry Varinius, though this plan is halted after her father's death. Varinius attacks Spartacus at Mt Vesuvius and is captured. Moments later, he is pushed by Crixus and killed by a flaming projectile hurled by Glaber's men after Glaber attacks Spartacus as his turn.
- Gallienus (Timothy Raby) - The new magistrate of Capua in the wake of the death of Titus Calavius. He survives at the arena’s collapse during the attack of Spartacus and his rebels. His whereabouts are unknown because he does not appear in Spartacus : House of Ashur.

==== Others ====
- The Egyptian (Stephen Dunlevy) - a silent yet deadly Egyptian taken from prison by Ashur to aid Glaber in his struggle against Spartacus. Killed by Oenomaus and Gannicus in the battle at Mt Vesuvius.
- Abrax (Toby Lawry) - a brutal Celt found at a brothel in Capua who is called on by Ashur to aid Glaber in his struggle against Spartacus. Killed by Gannicus while trying to protect Ilithyia.
- Fimbria (James Michalopoulos) - an imposing Greek who is among the first of a group put together by Ashur to aid Glaber in his struggle against Spartacus. Killed by Spartacus while trying to defend Glaber.
- Danus (Shaughan Campbell) - a ruthless Roman who is among the first of a group put together by Ashur to aid Glaber in his struggle against Spartacus. Killed by Gannicus in the battle at Mt Vesuvius.
- Nileus (Steven Gray) - a beast-like Syrian who is among the first of a group put together by Ashur to aid Glaber in his struggle against Spartacus. Killed by the Rebels in the battle at Mt Vesuvius.

=== War of the Damned ===
==== Rebels ====
- Belesa (Luna Rioumina) - a Thracian slave who catches the interest of both Saxa and Gannicus, becoming involved with the former. She becomes Saxa's lover. She is one of the few slaves who manage to survive to flee over the mountains to true freedom.
- Brictius (Jason Hassel) - a Gaul slave turned rebel. An aggressive, hostile, and reckless rebel who craves Roman blood above all else and detests rebels with morality such as Spartacus. Dies along with his lover, Veranda, in Crixus' attempt to take Rome; being slain by Caesar.
- Castus (Blessing Mokgohloa) - a pirate in league with Heracleo who falls for Nasir, earning the enmity of Agron. He gets drunk and is left behind by his fellow pirates and is therefore not part of their betrayal. After spending a brief period as a captive of the rebels, he is eventually accepted into their ranks. He falls in the final battle against Crassus' army.
- Diotimos (Kelson Henderson) - A slave escaped from Sinuessa en Valle and a friend of Sibyl. He joins Spartacus army and provides details that help them take the city. He returns to his former villa to rescue his fellow slaves but is mortally wounded by his former master who is then killed by Gannicus in turn, avenging him.
- Kore (Jenna Lind) - a loyal slave to her lover, Marcus Crassus; the Roman tasked to bring an end to Spartacus and his rebellion. Her deep feelings for her master are tested when she is raped by his son, Tiberius. Crassus' enduring loyalty for his son drives her to flee and join the rebellion. When Tiberius is captured and exchanged for 500 rebels, Kore kills him in a fit of rage. In order that the exchange will be honored, she returns to Crassus in his stead. Though she and Caesar lie to Crassus about who killed Tiberius, Spartacus inadvertently reveals the truth which she then give to Crassus. After the rebels are defeated, Crassus forgives her for killing Tiberius as well as earning her forgiveness for not being aware of her suffering, but is forced to have her crucified for aiding the rebellion in the end; much to his sadness.
- Sibyl (Gwendoline Taylor) - a devout, young slave and friend of Diotimos. She is saved by Gannicus when the rebels sack Sinuessa en Valle. She falls in love with him. Though he initially ridicules her youth and naivete, he eventually becomes her lover. She is one of the few slaves to survive to flee over the mountains to true freedom.
- Timocles (Tim Eccles) - a Greek slave turned rebel. He survives the final battle and escapes the battlefield as one of the few slaves to survive to flee over the mountains to true freedom.
- Veranda (Vanessa Cater) - A Gaul slave turned rebel. The lover of Brictius, she shares his ruthless personality against Romans on the battlefield. She is killed by Roman soldiers during an attempt to take Rome with Crixus.

==== Romans ====
- Attius (Cohen Holloway) - A Roman blacksmith living in Sinuessa en Valle. He is acquainted with Gannicus. When Spartacus and Gannicus arrive with plans to take the city, he secretly crafts them swords and then is blackmailed into helping. He is shown to be disturbed by the actions of the rebels after their success and is particularly antagonistic with Crixus and Naevia, who do not trust him. When Laeta hides the surviving Romans, Naevia assumes he is responsible and beats him to death in his forge.
- Laeta (Anna Hutchison) - a privileged wife of a Roman dignitary who becomes entangled in the struggle against Spartacus. After the fall of Sinuessa en Valle, she negotiates with Spartacus to keep herself and her fellow captive Romans alive. When liberated by Crassus, she is sold to Heracleo and branded a slave. She escapes with Gannicus and Sibyl after killing the pirate captain, joins the rebellion and becomes Spartacus' lover. She is one of the few slaves to survive to flee over the mountains to true freedom.
- Sabinus (Aaron Jakubenko) - Tiberius' friend and second-in-command. When Crassus punishes Tiberius' army with decimation, Sabinus draws the unlucky stone and is beaten to death by his fellow soldiers, including a distraught Tiberius.
- Metellus (Colin Moy) - A Roman senator who gives to Cossinius and Furius the task to kill Spartacus and his army after the deaths of Varinius, Glaber and Scrofa. After theirs deaths, Metellus gives to Crassus the same mission. Seeing that Crassus's campaign gives apparently no results, he loses patience. After Crassus's victory and the reconquest of Sinuessa in Valle, Crassus invites Metellus as his ally and sends him to Rome to announce the coming demise of Spartacus. But Spartacus and his army escape of Crassus's trap in the snowy mountains, and Metellus loses patience once again, but this time Crassus hit him many times. Caesar stops him before he beats Metellus to death. Crassus tells Metellus to return to Rome and threatens to have him assassinated if he were to speak of his beating. Metellus later appears after the final battle alongside a returning Pompey, who he has given credit to defeating Spartacus (as a mean of revenge on Crassus).
- Pompey (Joel Tobeck) - Mentioned in Spartacus: Vengeance and during Spartacus: War of the Damned, Pompey appears after the final battle with Metellus. He steals the glory of Crassus and Caesar despite their victory over Spartacus and his army after his army has killed many rebels who tried to escape north. In House of Ashur, Pompey is in conflict with Crassus, their quarrel risks to cause a civil war. He reappears later in Capua to marry with Viridia, the daughter of his ally Gabinius. Pompey is drugged by Achillia on Ashur's orders and is surprised with her by Gabinius. Furious, Gabinius disrupts the union between Pompey and Viridia and abandons him to support Crassus, but Pompey still in a drug haze gravely wounds Gabinius. Pompey orders Ashur to search his medicus but Ashur says that he has no more medicus. Caesar says to Pompey to flee. Caesar informs Cossutia and Viridia that Pompey has been stripped of his title and protection and that he has ordered to find and kill him.

==== Others ====
- Canthara (Ayşe Tezel) - An Egyptian slave owned by Caesar whom values her deeply. She is killed by Tiberius for knowing about his tormenting of Kore, either by Tiberius himself or someone on his orders.
- Heracleo (Vince Colosimo) - A Cilician pirate. He raids rival trading ships with the secret blessing of Laeta's husband. He initially helps Spartacus (even calling him King Spartacus) by selling food to the rebels in Sinuessa en Valle. However, he betrays them to the Romans in return for gold and Laeta. After he brands Laeta as a slave and takes Sibyl as hostage, he is distracted by Gannicus and killed by Laeta.
- Hilarus (Richard Norton) - A middle-aged Gladiator, purchased by Crassus to train him in the fighting style of a Gladiator. Crassus respects him, chastising Tiberius when his son speaks otherwise. In order to test his preparedness to meet Spartacus in battle, Crassus wages Hilarus' freedom in a fight to the death and Hilarus is narrowly beaten and fatally wounded.
- Opelia (T-Ann Robson) - A Greek slave owned by Caesar whom values her deeply. She is good friends with Canthara and is left emotionally shaken by her murder, but is soothed by Caesar who promises her justice before rekindling their loving bond. Opelia does not appear in Spartacus : House of Ashur.

=== House of Ashur ===
==== House of Ashur (formerly House of Batiatus) ====
- Hilara (Jamaica Vaughan) - One of Ashur's lovers. She is considered as his favorite. When Hilara will see that Ashur has feelings for Viridia, she will admit her feelings for Messia. She is saddened when Messia will leave with Cornelia but will celebrate in the stands the victory of House of Ashur, during the games to honor Gabinius, with Ashur.
- Messia (Ivana Baquero) - The second lover of Ashur. Despite this she is loyal to Ashur and likes him, she secretly falls in love of her friend Hilara. Feeling abandoned by Hilara and Ashur, Messia will become Cornelia's lover. When Cornelia leaves Capua, Messia will follow her.
- Neferet / Achillia (Tenika Davis) - A numidian warrior captured by the Romans. Ashur and Korris will meet her in Neapolis when she tries to escape, Ashur will save her and impressioned by her prowess buys her. Wanting to be free, she tries to kill Ashur but he proposes her an alternative : if she becomes a gladiator, that she fights for him and wins in the arena and she calls him dominus, she will be free. Achillia accepts and Ashur wins his new warrior. Achillia joins the Brotherhood when she gives a scratch to Korris despite her defeat and with Ashur begins her training to become a gladiator. Celadus will be the first gladiator who sympathize with her and they will become lovers. Achillia will be presented as the champion of House of Ashur as the Goddess of Death. For her first fight in the arena, she had to fight the Ferox Brothers but instead she will fight Ammonius. After a fierce fight, Achillia will kill him but she will be injured at the hand. Thanks to Echemus the new medicus of House of Ashur, Achillia will recover. After her recovering, Achillia will be welcome in the Brotherhood by Hedylus and the others gladiators except Erato, Ephesius and Tarchon. Achillia will try to make peace with Tarchon but he reinjures to her hand and Achillia can not return in the arena. She will be devastated by the death of Celadus. During Ashur's plan to disrupt the wedding between Viridia and Pompey, Achillia reveals that she has sold to the Romans for having accidentally killed a girl, a future queen that she was meant to protect. Soon after, completely recovered, Achillia becomes again the champion of House of Ashur and makes peace with Tarchon. She succeeds to kill the Scythian Gladiatrix, during the games to honor Gabinius, avenging Celadus. After this, Achillia and Tarchon become lovers.
- Korris (Graham McTavish) - Ashur's Doctore. A former gladiator who won his freedom in the arena as Gannicus before him. Soon after, Ashur bought Achillia, Korris fights her for having to kill Creticus. Even he defeats her, she succeeds to give him a scratch and he decides that she can join the Brotherhood and becomes a gladiator. When Ashur sends Korris to forge an alliance with Opiter, they become lovers. Later, Opiter planifies to flee in Sicilia and wishes that Korris goes with him. He reveals him his own involvement in Viridia's kidnapping. Korris refuses to join his escape, fearing Ashur's retribution against Opiter; consequently Opiter offers Ashur his entire ludus in exchange for Korris to go with him peacefully. Ashur agrees and Korris prepares his departure, choosing Celadus as the new doctore of House of Ashur. But they will find Opiter and his entire household murdered, apparently by the Cilician Pirates. Korris will be devastated by the death of his lover. When he will see Satyrus with the pendant that he had offer to Opiter, Korris will understand that the Ferox Brothers are Opiter's murderers. Ashur will stop him but will be agree to help him to avenge. Korris will appear when Ashur and five of his gladiators will prepare to fight the Ferox Brothers and four others gladiators of Proculus in the arena. He will want to fight them alone to avenge Opiter. Korris kills easily three gladiators of Proculus, the fourth is killed by Ashur whereas he tries to flee. Satyrus fights Korris with his brothers, but Korris proves to be more powerful as he kills Musicus and Balbus and defeats easily the last of Ferox Brothers. Korris prepares to finish Satyrus but finally spares him to that he delivers a message to his dominus. Korris will become again the Doctore of House of Ashur. After Celadus's death, Korris will convince finally Tarchon to make peace with Achillia.
- Celadus (Dan Hamill) - One of the more formidable gladiators in the Ludus, only being deprived the rank of champion due to a defeat against the younger Logas. In his prime he was skilled enough to best several champions, with Magnetius, (one of former champions of Titus Batiatus), being his most famous kill. Celadus will be the first gladiator of House of Ashur who sympathize with Achillia. They will become lovers. Celadus will become the new Doctore of House of Ashur when Korris will prepare to go with Opiter in Sicilia. But soon after, Korris will return after Opiter’s death and Celadus becomes a gladiator again. After that Tarchon reinjures Achillia to her hand, Celadus becomes the new temporary champion of House of Ashur, but he is unfortunately killed by the Scythian Gladiatrix, new champion of Proculus.
- Tarchon (Jordi Webber) - Another one of strongest gladiators of House of Ashur. Tarchon deeply loves and respects his father Celadus, and heeds him almost as often as Korris when he trains. The two have a close bond. He is the most fiercest rival of Achillia, not accepting a woman among the gladiators. During the recovering of Achillia, Tarchon becomes the temporary champion of House of Ashur. But after he reinjures Achillia to her hand, Ashur retires him this title. However, Tarchon participates at the fight against House of Proculus, he kills his opponent, Viction, one of gladiators of Proculus and succeeds to arrange the death of the Portly roman who possesses his lover Elata. He will look powerless Celadus’s death. Korris will convince him to make peace with Achillia. After avenging Celadus, Tarchon and Achillia become lovers.
- Rhodius (George Burgess) - One of Gladiators of Ashur. He dares to mock and challenge him. He was killed during a one-on-one impromptu match with Ashur. He was later described by Korris as the most "well-honed" among Ashur's gladiators after his death.
- Logas (Joe Davidson) - One of Gladiators of Ashur. He succeeds to defeat Celadus and becomes the new champion of House of Ashur, but he is killed by the Ferox Brothers in the arena in front of Ashur and Korris.
- Creticus (Stephen Madsen) - One of Gladiators of Ashur. He hates Achillia as the majority of gladiators of House of Ashur. He tries to rape Achillia with Ephesius but Achillia injures him with her bare hands and he dies of his injury.
- Ephesius (Evander Brown) - One of Gladiators of Ashur. He hates Achillia as the majority of gladiators of House of Ashur. He tries to rape Achillia with his comrade and friend Creticus but Achillia kills Creticus and hit him. Later, he accompanies Ashur with four others gladiators to fight in an ambush by the Ferox Brothers and four others Gladiators of Proculus.
- Hedylus (Graham Vincent) - One of Gladiators of Ashur. After Achillia's recovery, he will be the second gladiator to welcome her in the Brotherhood followed by all the others except Ephesius, Erato and Tarchon. Later, he accompanies Ashur with four others gladiators to fight in an ambush by the Ferox Brothers and four others Gladiators of Proculus.
- Erato (Louis Hunter) - One of Gladiators of Ashur. He trains with his comrades and friends Tarchon, Ephesius and Creticus. He is one of the more weakness gladiators of Ashur. He is the more impulsive too. He hates Achillia as the majority of gladiators of House of Ashur, specially after she kills Creticus.
- Dacus (Duane Evans) - A slave of the House of Ashur tasked with the readying the training equipment of the ludus. As the majority of the Gladiators of Ashur, he will be glad to see Achillia again after her recovery.
- Salvius (Donald Ross) - One of Gladiators of Ashur. Later, he accompanies Ashur with four others gladiators to fight in an ambush by the Ferox Brothers and four others Gladiators of Proculus.
- Helios (Joel Abadal) - One of Gladiators of Ashur. During a third fight between House of Ashur and House of Proculus, Helios is killed by Satyrus in a gladiatoral match in the arena.
- Firmus - One of Gladiators of Ashur. He trains often with Illugorus. Later, he accompanies Ashur with four others gladiators to fight in an ambush by the Ferox Brothers and four others Gladiators of Proculus.
- Illugorus - One of Gladiators of Ashur. He trains often with Firmus. Later, he accompanies Ashur with four others gladiators to fight in an ambush by the Ferox Brothers and four others Gladiators of Proculus.

==== Others gladiators ====
- Satyrus (Leigh Gill) - The leader of Ferox Brothers. They are Proculus's favorite gladiators. With his brothers, he has killed many gladiators as Logas the former champion of House of Ashur despite of their little size. Later with his brothers, he murders Opiter under orders from Proculus to stop him from fleeing to Sicilia and giving his ludus to Ashur. Soon after, he ambushes Ashur in the arena with his brothers and four others gladiators of Proculus. But Ashur reveals that he is accompanied by five of his gladiators, and whereas they prepare to fight, Korris appears. He wants to fight the Ferox Brothers and the others alone to avenge Opiter. Korris kills easily three gladiators of Proculus, the fourth is killed by Ashur whereas he tries to flee. Satyrus fights Korris with his brothers, but Korris proves to be more powerful as he kills Musicus and Balbus and defeats easily the last of Ferox Brothers. Korris prepares to finish Satyrus but finally spares him to that he delivers a message to his dominus. After his failure and the deaths of his brothers, Satyrus is almost denied by Proculus and mocked by the crowd, during a new match between House of Ashur and House of Proculus. But he succeeds to survive to his fight and kills Helios, one of gladiators of Ashur. During the games to honor Gabinius, he teams with Galatea a new gladiatrix and together they kill their opponent Taurus.
- Balbus (Daniel Bos) - One of Ferox Brothers. He is the second of Ferox Brothers to die, killed by Korris to avenge Opiter.
- Musicus (Mikey Thompson) - One of Ferox Brothers. He is the first of Ferox Brothers to die, killed by Korris to avenge Opiter.
- Ammonius (Josh Randall) - One of Gladiators of Proculus and his champion. With the Ferox Brothers, he is one of his favorite gladiators. He will be killed by Achillia, after a fierce fight.
- Harbelex - One of Gladiators of Proculus. He is killed by Celadus.
- Boriatis - One of Gladiators of Proculus. He injures Celadus but Tarchon arrives to save his father and stabs him, then the two gladiators kill him.
- Pluton - One of Gladiators of Opiter. He is killed by Ammonius.
- Viction - One of Gladiators of Proculus. He is used by Tarchon to kill the Portly roman who possesses Elata and Tarchon will kill Viction soon after.
- Taurus - The new champion of Pompeii. He is killed by Satyrus and Galatea.
- The Scythian Gladiatrix (Annie Mossman) - The Scythian Gladiatrix is the new champion of Proculus. During her first fight in the arena, she will kill Celadus. She will be killed soon after by Achillia during a fierce fight, avenging Celadus.
- Galatea (Pamela Sidhu) - A new gladiatrix of Proculus. She teams with Satyrus and together they kill their opponent Taurus.

==== Romans ====
- Cossutia (Claudia Black) - A powerful roman and wife of Gabinius. She loves her daughter Viridia. Cossutia is one of new rivals and enemies of Ashur. Believing that a former slave has not his place in her world, she will do everything to rid of Ashur and his house. When she notices that Viridia and Ashur become closer, she forms an alliance with Proculus to kill Ashur. But she will break the alliance when the plan will fail.
- Gabinius (Andrew McFarlane) - A powerful roman, husband of Cossutia and father of Viridia. Ashur will want to forge an alliance with him, but he will refuse. However, after Ashur saves Cossutia and Viridia from a group of Cilician Pirates, he accepts to give him a place for the next games in the arena. Later, Ashur confesses him that Cornelia wants to marry Viridia with Quintus Thermus, an ally of Caesar and that he has been sent to convince him to accept. But fearing that Caesar had his own plans, he suggests him to refuse this marriage and Gabinius agrees. Later, Gabinius is forced to give Viridia to marry her with Pompey to stop him to ally with Crassus and Caesar. Gabinius will show respect for Ashur, calling even him by his name. When Gabinius surprises Pompey with Achillia, he becomes furious. He disrupts the wedding between Viridia and Pompey and abandons him to support Crassus, but Pompey still in a drug haze gravely wounds Gabinius. Ashur will be forced to smother him after a Gabinius dying has discovered his role in this plot.
- Viridia (India Shaw-Smith) - Daughter of Cossutia and Gabinius. Her husband has been killed by Spartacus's rebels during the Siege of Sinuessa. When she meets Ashur, she thanks him to have killed Spartacus. Then, when a group of Cilician Pirates will try to kill her, Ashur will save her and her admiration for him will increase. When Ashur will present his champion Achillia, Viridia will admire her too. Viridia later confides to Ashur her dislike of Caesar's wife and they grow closer. Later, Viridia will reveal to Ashur that she is forced to marry with Pompey to stop him to ally with Crassus and Caesar and form a Triumvirate. After the death of her father killed by Pompey, Viridia will endure a new bereavement. Ashur arrives to support her and Viridia will kiss him before he leaves. She defends him against all who meprise him including her uncle. After the games to honor Gabinius and the victory of House of Ashur, Viridia sees Ashur celebrated in the stands with Hilara, saddening her.
- Proculus (Simon Arblaster) - A powerful roman possessing a house of Gladiators, his three favorite gladiators are the Ferox brothers and his champion Ammonius. Proculus is one of new rivals and enemies of Ashur and his archenemy. He loses Ammonius against Achillia representing the House of Ashur. He will want to forge an alliance with him but Ashur will refuse revealing indirectly that someone gives him his ludus, Proculus guesses that this person is Opiter. He will send the Ferox Brothers to murder him with his entire household to stop fleeing in Sicilia and giving his ludus to Ashur. Soon after, he will win Opiter's ludus at auction. Cossutia will form an alliance with him to kill Ashur. Proculus will send the Ferox Brothers and four others of his gladiators to ambush Ashur in the arena, but the ambush will fail and Proculus will lose four gladiators as well as Musicus and Balbus. During another fight against House of Ashur in the arena, he loses two others gladiators but he wins the primus thanks to his new champion : the Scythian Gladiatrix. During the games to honor Gabinius, he teams Satyrus with Galatea another gladiatrix. Together, they kill Taurus but Proculus will loose the Scythian Gladiatrix against Achillia and his House is defeated once again by the House of Ashur.
- Horatia (Lisa Chappell) - A Roman noble and wife of Aedile Uvidus and close friend and confidant of Cossutia. She is killed by a group of Cilician Pirates wanting to kill Cossutia and Viridia.
- Modesta (Jacque Drew) - A Roman noble and one of Cossutia's friends.
- Lafrenia (Tandi Wright) - A Roman noble and another of Cossutia's friends.
- Opiter (Arlo Gibson) - A roman lanista in Capua. Ashur will send Korris to forge an alliance with him. Opiter and Korris will become secretly lovers. Later, Opiter planifies to flee in Sicilia and wishes that Korris goes with him. He reveals him his own involvement in Viridia's kidnapping. Korris refuses to join his escape, fearing Ashur's retribution against Opiter; consequently Opiter offers Ashur his entire ludus in exchange for Korris to go with him peacefully. Ashur agrees and Korris prepares his departure, choosing Celadus as the new doctore of House of Ashur. But Opiter will be murdered by the Ferox Brothers on Proculus's orders to stop fleeing and giving his ludus to Ashur.
- Uvidus (Cameron Rhodes) - The new Aedile of Capua after Mercato's death and Horatia's husband.
- Servius (Adam Gardiner) - The brother of Gabinius, uncle of Viridia and brother-in-law of Cossutia. He arrives to Capua after the death of his brother. He wants to submit his niece and his sister-in-law. As Cossutia, he hates Ashur and presents the games to honor his brother.
- Cornelia (Jaime Slater) - Caesar's wife. Mentioned in Spartacus: Blood and Sand and Spartacus: War of the Damned, she appears with his husband when they arrive in Ashur's villa instead of Crassus. They sleep with Ashur's lovers, Hilara and Messia to assert their dominance over him. Later, Caesar informs Ashur that he is forced to leave early to meet Pompey but Cornelia will stay behind. She humiliates Ashur every time she can. Cornelia will take Messia as her lover. When Cornelia will leave Capua, Messia will follow her.

==== Others characters ====
- Fides (Mel Odedra) - One of Proculus' men hired by Cossutia to kill Korris but after failing to complete the task, he was killed by Cossutia to coverup the plot.
- Elata (Eden Hart) - Tarchon's lover. He loves her and does not share her with anyone. During the fight between Tarchon and Viction, one of gladiators of Proculus, she discreetly pushes the Portly roman who possesses her, in the arena. Tarchon counters Viction’s attack and Viction kills the Portly roman, allowing to Tarchon and Elata to be together.
- Ashur's Medicus - The Medicus of House of Ashur. When the Medicus insists to amputate Achillia's hand, Ashur throws him off the ludus's cliff.
- Echemus (Jeff Szusterman) - Opiter's household Medicus until he is gifted to the House of Ashur to aid in the recovery of Achillia after receiving wounds during her fight against Ammonius. He becomes the new Medicus of House of Ashur. He speaks only the greek too. After Proculus wins Opiter’s ludus at auction, he comes into Ashur’s villa with Satyrus and Uvidus to claim Echemus, leaving Ashur without a medicus again.
- Sentius - A slave of House of Opiter. He will be murdered along with the entire household and his dominus by the Ferox Brothers.
- The Portly roman (Murray Keane) - The Portly roman possesses Elata, Tarchon’s lover. During the fight between Tarchon and Viction, one of gladiators of Proculus, Elata discreetly pushes him in the arena, then Tarchon counters Viction’s attack and the Portly roman is killed by Viction, whereas he tried to flee.
- Calpurnius (Patrick Hales) - The new magistrate of Pompeii. He gives a lot of his gladiators during the games to honor Gabinius, but many of them including his champion Taurus are killed by the gladiators of Proculus. Taurus will be killed by Satyrus and Galatea.
