= Spartacus: House of Ashur =

2025 American television series

- Genre: Historical drama; Sword-and-sandal
- Created by: Steven S. DeKnight
- Starring: Nick E. Tarabay; Graham McTavish; Tenika Davis; Claudia Black; Jamaica Vaughan; Ivana Baquero; Leigh Gill; Jordi Webber; India Shaw-Smith
- Composer: Joseph LoDuca
- Country of origin: United States
- Original language: English
- No. of seasons: 1
- No. of episodes: 10

Production
- Executive producers: Steven S. DeKnight; Rick Jacobson; Aaron Helbing
- Producers: Karen Bailey; Jocelyn Sabo
- Running time: 51–63 minutes
- Production companies: DeKnight Productions; Lionsgate Television

Original release
- Network: Starz
- Release: December 5, 2025 – February 6, 2026

Related
- Spartacus

Spartacus: House of Ashur is an American historical drama television series created by Steven S. DeKnight that serves as a sequel to DeKnight's previous series Spartacus (2010–2013). It follows the character Ashur in an alternate timeline in which he was not killed on Mount Vesuvius.

The series premiered on Starz on December 5, 2025, and concluded on February 6, 2026. In May 2026, Starz canceled the series after one season.

== Premise ==
The series follows an alternate timeline for the former gladiator Ashur, where he was not killed on Mount Vesuvius during the second season of Spartacus. Instead, he is gifted the ludus that belonged to his former master as a reward for aiding the Romans in ending a slave rebellion.

== Cast and characters ==
=== Main ===
- Nick E. Tarabay as Ashur
- Graham McTavish as Korris
- Tenika Davis as Neferet / Achillia
- Claudia Black as Cossutia
- Jamaica Vaughan as Hilara
- Ivana Baquero as Messia
- Leigh Gill as Satyrus
- Jordi Webber as Tarchon
- India Shaw-Smith as Viridia

=== Recurring ===
- Evander Brown Jr. as Ephesius
- Graham Vincent as Hedylus
- Louis Hunter as Erato
- Donald Ross as Salvius
- Daniel Hamill as Celadus
- Mikey Thompson as Musicus
- Daniel Bos as Balbus
- Andrew McFarlane as Gabinius
- Simon Arblaster as Proculus
- Arlo Gibson as Opiter
- Cameron Rhodes as Uvidus
- Jackson Gallagher as Gaius Julius Caesar
- Duane Wichman Evans as Dacus
- Eden Hart as Elata
- Jaime Slater as Cornelia

=== Guest ===
- Lucy Lawless as Lucretia
- Stephen Madsen as Creticus
- Annie Mossman as the Scythian
- Joel Tobeck as Pompey
- Adam Gardiner as Servius
- Pamela Sidhu as Galatea

== Episodes ==
No.	Title	Directed by	Written by	Original release date
1	"Dominus"	Rick Jacobson	Steven S. DeKnight	December 5, 2025
In the underworld, Lucretia mocks Ashur for his past misdeeds before he awakes in an alternate timeline where he killed Spartacus and in reward is given charge of Batiatus' ludus by Marcus Crassus. Ashur hopes to rebuild Capua's arena (previously destroyed by Spartacus' rebels) with Crassus' support. To gain higher standing in Capuan society, Ashur enters his top gladiator into the local games but his chosen fighter is slain by the Brothers Ferox, a trio of dwarf gladiators from rival lanista Proculus' stable, in a bid by noblewoman Cossutia to humiliate him and ban his house from future games. Undeterred, Ashur looks for a new attraction and recruits an enslaved female Nubian warrior and christens her Achillia with the intention of turning her into a female gladiator.
2	"Forsaken"	Rick Jacobson	Aaron Helbing	December 5, 2025
Achillia begins training with the other gladiators, but they do not share Ashur's enthusiasm for her and she clashes with Doctore Korris, who questions her place in the ludus. Achillia is also threatened by Ashur's personal servant and lover Hilara for fear of her master's safety. Ashur is invited to meet Cossutia's husband, Senator Gabinius, a supporter of Crassus' rival Pompey, at his villa where he is unexpectedly introduced to their widowed daughter Viridia. Viridia, who lost her husband to Spartacus and his rebels, thanks Ashur for killing him which draws both his interest and Cossutia's chagrin. Gabinius questions Ashur over his continued loyalty to the Roman republic and Crassus despite being a former slave, and after discovering Ashur's true feelings about him kicks him out of the villa. Two of the gladiators attempt to rape Achillia but she castrates one of the attackers, leading him to bleed to death. Confronted by the members of the ludus, Korris forces her to fight him with real swords. Although Korris defeats her, he doesn't kill her after realizing that she had managed to wound him, earning his respect and protection.
3	"Unworthy"	Michael Hurst	Sidney Quashie	December 12, 2025
The ludus' gladiators continue to bristle at Achillia's presence. Ashur sends out Korris to seek out and seduce lanista Opiter to gain his favor, and Korris tasks veteran gladiator Celadus with being Doctore in his absence. Opiter offers Korris an opportunity to become his Doctore in exchange for the ludus' entry into Gabinius' upcoming games. Korris later survives an attack by a group of men he believes were sent by Proculus, unaware that they were sent by Cossutia. Korris kills them all except for their leader who escapes. Hilara tells Ashur of seeing scars on Achillia's hand, leading him to train her personally, sensing her to be troubled by past trauma. Achillia reveals to him her feelings of unworthiness as a warrior, and Ashur urges her to move on; however Achillia is still haunted by memories of her inability to stop a girl from being abducted from her village. Hilara's best friend Messia tries to confess her feelings for her, but Hilara tells Messia that they will remain friends and chooses Ashur over her. Gabinius reveals to Cossutia that he was testing Ashur to see where his loyalties truly lie, arguing that he may be useful in future conflict against Crassus and pushes aside his wife's disgust for him. Cossutia later destroys a letter meant for her husband, and kills the man who led the attack on Korris for his failure. Ashur asks Achillia to take an oath and commit to the ludus, and he brands her with the symbol of the house.
4	"Blood and Bone"	Maja Vrvilo	Ihuoma Ofordire	December 19, 2025
Achillia starts using an unorthodox dual sword fighting style as Celadus trains her to fight the Brothers Ferox. Celadus admits to her his fears for his son, arrogant fellow gladiator Tarchon. He pits Achillia and Tarchon against each other in training, where Achillia humbles him, deepening their rivalry and creating further tension between father and son. Ashur receives a message from Crassus informing him of his apparent future arrival. He makes preparations to welcome him, but is frustrated that his ludus has not been given entry to the games yet. After Ashur taunts Proculus and the Brothers Ferox in public, he is pelted by the crowd, further frustrating him. Opiter tries to convince Cossutia to let Ashur's ludus compete, but learns Korris was attacked and wounded. Opiter visits him at the ludus and admits his feelings for him. Cossutia, Viridia and their friend Horatia are attacked while out shopping by Cilician pirates; Horatia is killed and Viridia is kidnapped. A passing Ashur and Korris fight off the attackers and Ashur rescues Viridia. In gratitude, Gabinius offers Ashur entry to the games with raised position. The ludus receives their visitor, revealing him to be not Crassus but Julius Caesar.
5	"Goddess of Death"	Julian Holmes	Adam Bradley & Steven S. DeKnight	December 26, 2025
Caesar and his wife Cornelia take over Ashur's villa, much to his chagrin, and they have sex with Hilara and Messia in front of Ashur in order to assert their dominance over him. Caesar reveals his men had carried out Viridia's kidnapping so that Ashur could gain favor with her family, part of a plot by Crassus to sway Gabinius against Pompey. A number of gladiators, including Celadus and Tarchon, are chosen to fight in the games, with Achillia presented as champion of the ludus. Gabinius agrees to let Caesar present the games alongside him in a bid to influence Pompey into dealing with the Cilician pirates; in exchange he elevates Achillia's fight with the Brothers Ferox to the main event. At a party held on the eve of the games, Ashur reveals Achillia to Capua's elite, receiving a mixed response, while Proculus witnesses Opiter and Korris together and Hilara observes Viridia's increasing fondness for Ashur. Afterwards, Achillia and Celadus sleep together. During the games, Celadus and Tarchon prevail in their match, while Achillia is greeted by a hostile crowd and instead of the brothers, faces Ammonius, Proculus' champion at Gabinius' behest. At first Achillia's speed is unable to overcome her opponent's strength and she suffers a severe hand injury, but she manages to move behind him and stab him through the anus before killing him. The crowd and Ashur's gladiators hail Achillia's victory. Caesar informs Ashur that he is forced to leave early to meet Pompey but Cornelia will stay behind.
6	"Empty Things"	Debs Paterson	Eliana Pipes	January 2, 2026
Achillia is brought back to the ludus. Delirious from blood loss and infection, she dreams of the village girl's abduction, revealing that Achillia accidentally killed her with a thrown spear while trying to rescue her. Ashur throws the medicus off the ludus' cliff after he insists on amputating her hand, and sends Korris to Opiter to find a replacement. Opiter tells him he is planning to flee Capua after revealing his own involvement in Viridia's kidnapping. Korris refuses to join his escape, fearing Ashur's retribution against Opiter; consequently Opiter offers Ashur his entire ludus in exchange for Korris to go with him peacefully. Cornelia humiliates Ashur by forcing him to strip naked in front of Cossutia and Viridia; an upset Viridia later confides to Ashur her dislike of Caesar's wife and they grow closer. Cornelia seduces Cossutia to gain influence over her and her husband, and later tells Ashur to convince Gabinius to let his daughter marry Thermus, an ally of Caesar, rattling him. Ashur tells him that he believes Caesar has his own plans and convinces Gabinius not to marry off Viridia to Thermus. Despite his rejection of the gods, Ashur prays for Achillia, bringing her out of her delirium. With Achillia recovering, Tarchon is chosen to be temporary champion with Celadus made new Doctore with Korris' impending departure. Ashur turns down an alliance with Proculus, revealing indirectly Opiter's offer to give up his ludus to him. Just as Korris and Ashur set out to meet him, Opiter and his entire household is slaughtered by the Brothers Ferox.
7	"Deepest Wound"	Mark Beesley	Beverly Okhio	January 9, 2026
Korris and Ashur discover Opiter's body, leaving Korris distraught for days, and the Cilicians are blamed for the attack. A grief-stricken Cossutia suggests games be held in Opiter's honor. Achillia returns to training, where she is welcomed by many of the other gladiators. She challenges Tarchon, but he defeats her as she has not fully recovered from her injuries. No longer able to wield dual swords, she refuses to switch to spear, still haunted by the accidental killing of the village girl; however after a challenge from Tarchon she demonstrates her prowess with the weapon, though she loses the fight after suffering another flashback. Ashur seeks to purchase Opiter's estate but is unable to afford it. He tries to blackmail Cornelia assuming that Caesar was behind Opiter's death but is unsuccessful after Ashur realizes that his exchange with Proculus led to the murder. After a drunk Korris attempts to confront Cornelia, Ashur reluctantly admits his role in Opiter's death to him, enraging Korris, but Ashur agrees to help him take revenge on Proculus. Ashur returns to Cornelia and again agrees to support Thermus' marriage to Viridia in exchange for the funds. At the auction, Proculus and Ashur trade bids with Ashur prevailing; however Cornelia revokes her support after learning from Cossutia that Ashur told Gabinius to disapprove the marriage and Proculus wins the estate. Ashur tells Cossutia of Proculus' role in Opiter's death while Korris spots Opiter's pendant on the belt of Satyrus, the leader of the Brothers Ferox. Cossutia confronts Proculus but admits she hates Ashur more and sets up a trap for him. The Brothers Ferox and Proculus' men ambush Ashur but he, Korris and his gladiators fight them off. Korris kills two of the brothers, leaving Satyrus alive to deliver a message to Proculus. Korris is reinstated as Doctore.
8	"Horizons"	Toa Fraser	Henry G.M. Jones	January 23, 2026
Proculus and Satyrus confront Ashur at his villa, demanding compensation in the form of Opiter's former medicus, now in Ashur's employ. Proculus later threatens Cossutia and her daughter over the failed ambush. Gabinius is informed that Pompey, swayed by Caesar, will not deal with the Cilicians; Cossutia proposes marrying Viridia off to Pompey to secure their influence over him as well as her future safety. Desperate, Gabinius agrees to the plan and informs his daughter of the proposal. Korris appoints Achillia champion once more, and she trains to compete in new games held to distract Capua from the Cilician attacks. Tarchon breaks off his relationship with his father after recognizing Celadus' feelings for Achillia; she later tries to reason with him but they scuffle and she reinjures her hand. During the games, Ashur finds an upset Viridia and learns about the proposed marriage to Pompey; although Ashur tries to dissuade her she returns to her father and reluctantly agrees to the union. Put out to die by Proculus, Satyrus easily kills one of Ashur's gladiators, while Tarchon uses his match to engineer the death of an abusive client of his prostitute lover Elata. Ashur is forced to field Celadus instead of Achillia for the main event, annoying Gabinius and disappointing the crowd. Unexpectedly, he faces the Scythian, Proculus' own female gladiator; although Celadus draws first blood, she ultimately overwhelms him and Celadus dies by her hand while Tarchon, Korris and Ashur watch on.
9	"Those Who Remain"	Robyn Grace	Diya Mishra	January 30, 2026
Celadus' body is brought back to the ludus and a devastated Tarchon prepares it for the funeral pyre, while Korris urges Achillia to end the conflict with him. Cornelia informs Ashur that Pompey and Caesar will arrive in Capua to meet Viridia and her family, with Caesar angry about Viridia's betrothal and Ashur's failure to pair her with Thermus. Pompey agrees to the marriage, but Gabinius is troubled that Pompey wants a submissive wife. Caesar proposes Ashur assassinate Gabinius to disrupt the union; after Ashur baulks at the plan, Caesar threatens to withdraw Crassus' support of him, but promises to rebuild the arena and give Ashur control of all games in Capua if he carries it out. Achillia trains to take revenge on the Scythian, as does Tarchon who is adamant on becoming champion once more. While Pompey visits the ludus, she challenges Tarchon and they use real weapons in a fight to the death. Achillia defeats him, but convinces Pompey to spare his life; Korris later convinces Tarchon to make peace with her. In private with Pompey, Achillia reveals that she was sold into slavery by her father as punishment for the killing of the village girl, a royal she was meant to protect. On Ashur's orders she drugs Pompey with opium while Ashur sends a message to Gabinius requesting he come to the villa; there Gabinius catches a sleeping Pompey with Achillia. Furious, he wakes him and cancels the marriage with Viridia. Still in a drug haze, Pompey attacks and seriously wounds Gabinius in front of Ashur, Cornelia and Caesar, who helps Pompey flee. Alone with a seemingly unconscious Gabinius, a distraught Ashur admits guilt over what has occurred; however Gabinius has heard everything and attacks him. After a struggle, Ashur smothers Gabinius to death.
10	"Hail Caesar"	Rick Jacobson	Steven S. DeKnight	February 6, 2026
Gabinius is laid to rest at his villa. Caesar informs Cossutia that Pompey has been stripped of his title and protection, while Caesar himself has been promoted to legatus and ordered to find and kill him. Servius, Gabinius' brother returns to reclaim the household and proposes holding funeral games. Believing Ashur to be beneath him, Servius has him removed from the villa but Viridia kisses him before he leaves. Settling in, Servius tries to assert his control over Cossutia and Viridia. At the ludus, Tarchon helps train Achillia to take on the Scythian, while Proculus pairs Satyrus with Galatea, another female gladiator for the games. Ashur gifts Achillia her own private quarters, cementing her position as champion of the ludus, while Ashur promises Korris ownership of the ludus once he is given control of Capua's games. Cornelia leaves the villa to return to Rome, with Messia following her. At the games, Servius excludes Ashur's gladiators from all but the main event and forces him to sit with the plebians. Satyrus and Galatea defeat their opponent before Achillia battles the Scythian in a brutal fight that sees both fighters lose their weapons and intrude into the stands. Achillia ultimately defeats the Scythian, killing her by jamming her shield into her mouth and splitting her head open. Before she leaves, Viridia sees Ashur celebrate in the stands with Hilara, saddening her. Back at the ludus, Tarchon rejects Elata after she speaks ill of Celadus, then he and Achillia sleep together. While Caesar prepares to leave, Ashur asks him when the new arena will begin construction but Caesar tells him that Crassus has decided to use the funds to build new villas instead, despite their agreement. An enraged Ashur attacks Caesar, and after a long fight Ashur kills him by stabbing him in the chest and hacking his head open with a sword.

== Production ==
On February 9, 2023, Starz announced that they were developing a sequel series to Spartacus, with Steven S. DeKnight returning to produce. On November 9, 2023, Starz greenlit a ten-episode series titled Spartacus: House of Ashur, with DeKnight serving as showrunner and Nick E. Tarabay reprising his role of the eponymous character. In July 2024, Lucy Lawless was confirmed to be reprising her role as Lucretia in a guest appearance. Graham McTavish, Tenika Davis, Ivana Baquero, Jamaica Vaughan, Jordi Webber, Claudia Black, India Shaw-Smith, Cameron Rhodes, and Leigh Gill were also added to the cast.

In February 2026, DeKnight confirmed that a second season had already been written and was confident that it would be greenlit. However, on May 22, 2026, Starz canceled the series after one season. Lionsgate Television intends to shop the series to other platforms.

== Release ==
Spartacus: House of Ashur premiered on December 5, 2025, with its first two episodes, and ended on February 6, 2026.

== Reception ==
=== Critical reception ===
On the review aggregator website Rotten Tomatoes, Spartacus: House of Ashur holds an approval rating of 91% based on 11 reviews. The website's critical consensus reads, "A surprising plunge into the Spartacus canon, this House of Asher arrives narratively inspired and drenched in delectable drama and intrigue." Metacritic, which uses a weighted average, assigned a score of 75 out of 100 based on 9 critics, indicating "generally favorable" reviews.

=== Accolades ===
Spartacus: House of Ashur won four awards at the 2026 New Zealand Screen Awards held on 19 November 2026: "Best Cinematography - Drama Series" (David Garbett, Andrew McGeorge and Andrew Stroud), "Best Production Design - Series" (Iain Aitken), "Best Costume Design - Series" (Barbara Darragh) and "Best Makeup Design - Series" (Gabrielle Jones).
