= Nick E. Tarabay =

Lebanese actor (born 1975)

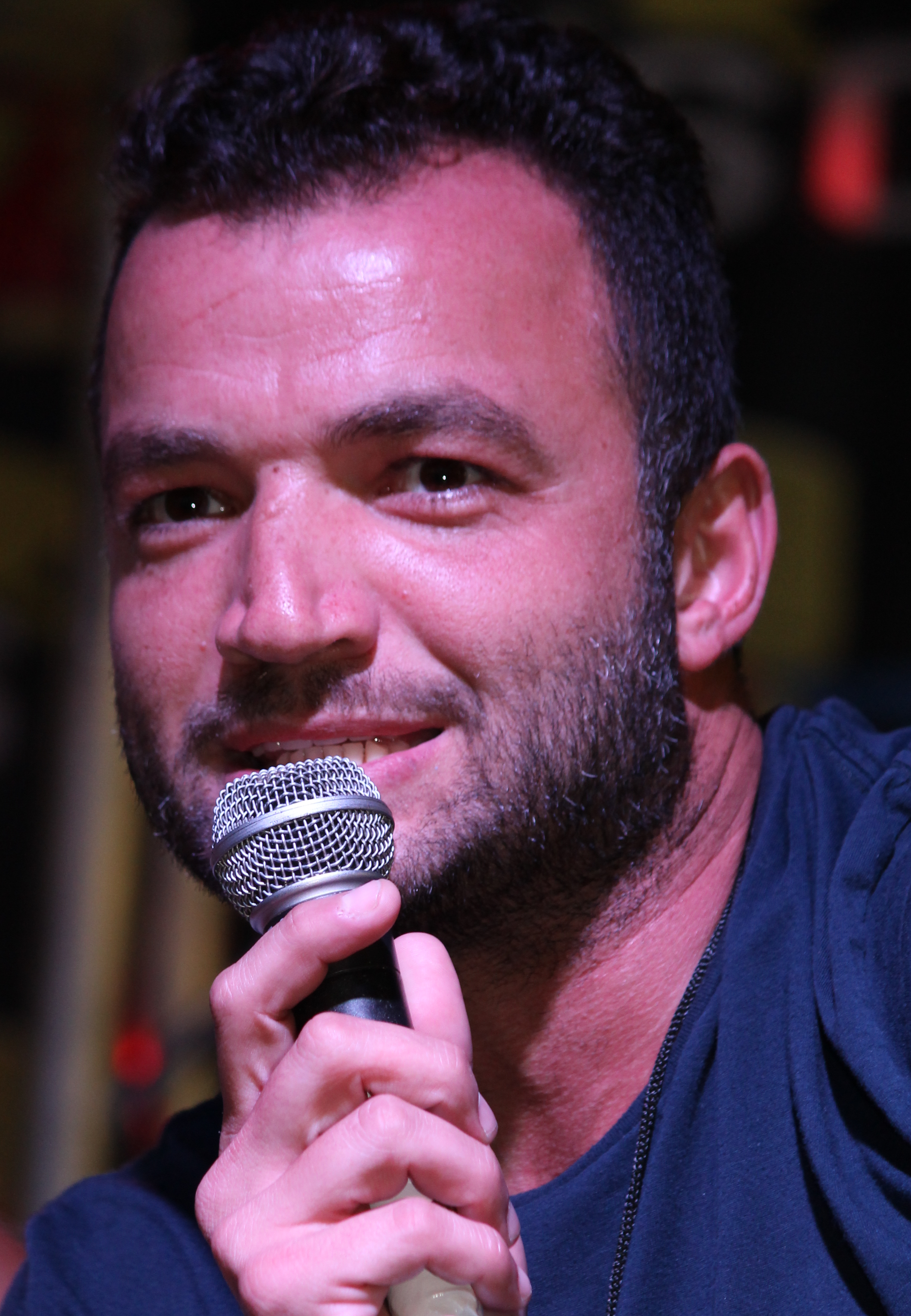
- Tarabay at Florida SuperCon 2014
- Born: Emad Tarabay (عماد تاراباي); 28 August 1975 (age 50); Beirut, Lebanon
- Occupation: Actor
- Years active: 2000–present

Nick Emad Tarabay (arabic: عماد تاراباي, born 28 August 1975) is a Lebanese actor. He is known for portraying Ashur in the Starz television series Spartacus and Cotyar in the science fiction television series The Expanse.

== Early life ==
Tarabay was born in Beirut, Lebanon, to a large family. His parents reside in Lebanon, as does his younger brother and a large extended family of cousins, uncles and aunts. He moved to New York after high school. As a clothing salesman, he worked for Hugo Boss and Gucci, while studying acting at the T. Schreiber Studio and appearing in Off-Off-Broadway plays. He moved to Los Angeles in 2004, where he studied under Larry Moss and appeared in their studio's staging of John Patrick Shanley's Danny and the Deep Blue Sea. He is married with 3 children, one daughter age 30, and twin sons age 24.

== Career ==
Tarabay made his television debut as an extra in an episode of Sex and the City (2000). He got another minor role in The Sopranos (2001–2004), where he played the role of Matush, a drug dealer. He also played the role of The Captor in David Ellison's 2005 dramatic short film When All Else Fails. As well he played a role in the 2008's television series Crash, in which he played the character Axel Finet, a hot-tempered police lieutenant. He was not brought back for the second season.

Tarabay played a central supporting role in the Starz series Spartacus: Blood and Sand in the character of Ashur, a former gladiator who was injured and now is used as an agent and spy. He also appears in the prequel miniseries Spartacus: Gods of the Arena with the same role prior to his injury, as well as the sequel to Blood and Sand, Spartacus: Vengeance. Tarabay reprised his role in a starring turn in Spartacus: House of Ashur, which presents an alternate timeline during which Ashur was not killed on Mount Vesuvius. In 2013, he appeared as Klingon patrol officer in J. J. Abrams' Star Trek Into Darkness.

Tarabay played a role in the seventh season of USA Network's Burn Notice as "Dexter Gamble." Additionally, Tarabay portrays Reiken in the Brent Ryan Green film The Veil. In 2014, he joined the cast of the CW series Arrow as supervillain Digger Harkness/Captain Boomerang. Tarabay served as a recurring character in the fourth season of Person of Interest as "Devon Grice," an ISA operative. He joined the TV show The Expanse in its second season. He played a delightful Russian 'security guard' in a Castle episode in February 2016. He voiced the role of Haluk in Bioware's 2019 video game Anthem. In October 2020 he was cast as the villain Eclipso in the second season of the CW television series Stargirl.

== Filmography ==
Film roles
Year	Title	Role	Notes
2013	Star Trek Into Darkness	Klingon	
2015	Death Valley	Roy Dillen	
2017	The Veil	Reiken	
2018	Pacific Rim: Uprising	Sonny	
2022	Wendell & Wild	Fawzi	Voice role
2026	The Odyssey	Pilot	

Television roles
Year	Title	Role	Notes
2000	Sex and the City	Dancer (uncredited)	Episode: "Where There's Smoke..."
2001–2004	The Sopranos	Matush	3 episodes (credited as Emad Tarabay)
2007	CSI: Miami	Neil Massey	Episode: "Triple Threat"
2007	The Unit	Fat Man / Man	2 episodes
2007	Moonlight	Ralf Martan	Episode: "Sleeping Beauty"
2008–2009	Crash	Axel Finet	Main role (season 1)
2009	Without a Trace	Bobby Elber	Episode: "Voir Dire"
2009	NCIS	Haziq Khaleel	Episode: "Legend (Part II)"
2010–2012	Spartacus: Blood and Sand	Ashur	Main role, 27 episodes
2011	Detroit 1-8-7	Amir Sakhani	Episode: "Stone Cold"
2012	Common Law	Cooper Williams	Episode: "Odd Couples"
2013	Burn Notice	Dexter Gamble	2 episodes
2013	Major Crimes	Jason Goss	Episode: "Backfire"
2014	Believe	Niko Zepada	5 episodes
2014, 2017	Arrow	Digger Harkness / Captain Boomerang	3 episodes
2014–2015	Person of Interest	Devon Grice	3 episodes
2015	Longmire	Tyler Malone	3 episodes
2016	Castle	Vasily Zhirov	Episode: "Dead Red"
2017–2018	The Expanse	Cotyar Ghazi	Recurring role (seasons 2–3), 15 episodes
2018	Taken	Boone	Episode: "Render"
2020	Motherland: Fort Salem	Witchfather	3 episodes
2021	MacGyver	Tibor Babic	Episode: "Jack + Kinematics + Safe Cracker + MgKNO3 + GTO"
2021	Stargirl	Eclipso	Main role (season 2)
2022	The Cleaning Lady	Julian Cortes	Episode: "Paradise Lost"
2025–2026	Spartacus: House of Ashur	Ashur	Main role

Video game roles
Year	Title	Role	Notes
2019	Anthem	Haluk	Voice role
2019	Call of Duty: Modern Warfare	Jamal "The Butcher" Rahar	Voice role and motion capture
2021	The Dark Pictures Anthology: House of Ashes	Salim Othman	Voice role
