= Jackson Gallagher =

Australian actor and professional photographer

- Born: Melbourne, Victoria, Australia
- Occupation: Actor
- Years active: 2008–present

Jackson Gallagher is an Australian actor and professional photographer from Victoria, Australia. Gallagher began his career starring in the Nine Network children's series The Saddle Club and later ventured into film playing the titular character in the 2013 horror film Patrick. He gained wider recognition for his role as Josh Barrett in the soap opera Home and Away. He left the series in 2016 and soon secured more television roles including AFL player Connor Marrello in the Network Ten drama series Playing for Keeps. He has also completed additional film roles scheduled for release in 2019. Aside from acting Gallagher has worked as a stills photographer for the Australian Broadcasting Corporation network.

== Early life ==
Gallagher was born in Melbourne and his family moved to Daylesford, Victoria. They made home on a one-hundred-acre farm which allowed Gallagher to practise horse riding. When he finished school Gallagher went to New York City and found work in a circus and later as a photography assistant. There he developed a liking for photography. He also studied acting at the Stella Adler Conservatory. He secured a pre-med course at Melbourne University which he opted to quit in favour of completing a Bachelor of Arts in film and anthropology. He graduated from the university in 2012. In 2014, Gallagher was caught up in two rockfalls while on a climbing expedition at the Franz Josef Glacier in New Zealand. He escaped without any injuries.

== Career ==
Gallagher began his career starring in the Nine Network children's series The Saddle Club as Ashley 'Chewie' Becker. The actor later went onto secure his first film role in the 2013 horror genre film Patrick. He played the titular character, but spent most of the film shoot bedbound. Film director Mark Hartley praised Gallagher's performance for bringing "inner menace" to the role.

In 2013 Gallagher worked as a professional photographer for the Australian Broadcasting Corporation network. He has stated that being a still photographer for the network allowed him to learn on-set technique. That year Gallagher joined the cast of the Australian soap opera Home and Away, playing the role of Josh Barrett. He was joined by Tai Hara who played his on-screen brother Andy Barrett. The two characters appeared in their own stand-alone webisodes titled Home and Away Extras, before making their debuts in the main show. Gallagher was hesitant about auditioning for the role of a sixteen-year-old because he thought he looked too old which could ruin his chances of success. He auditioned for the role on a Friday and was offered the role the following Monday. At the time Gallagher said "whatever idea they had in their heads of Josh, I happened to fit that image." The actor relocated to Sydney for filming and recalled being "terrified" about completing his first day on set. Jackson remained in the role for three years before he was written out in 2016.

In 2016, the actor played the part of gay character Kyle in Josh Thomas' comedy series Please Like Me. Gallagher also travelled to refugee camps located in the Middle Eastern country Jordan, where he worked as a photographer for the charity Act of Peace. His next project was a guest role of Tamas Lupei in the ABC drama The Doctor Blake Mysteries. In May 2018, it was announced that he had secured the regular role of Connor Marrello in the Network Ten drama series Playing for Keeps. The show is about a group of AFL players and their wives' personal lives. He also starred as Clay in the comedy series Back In Very Small Business.

In 2019, Gallagher filmed a main role in the Dee McLachlan directed film The Wheel, playing the role of Matthew Allen Mills. The film focuses on a group of prisoners who are forced to participate in scientific experiments. In August 2020, the film was released in the United Kingdom under the new title 2099: The Soldier Protocol.

Gallagher then began filming for a television series tentatively titled Ocean City. He also secured another film role in This Time, Maybe and appeared as Raf in the third series of ABC drama Glitch. In 2020, he appeared as Travis Kelly in the prison drama Wentworth and he later joined the cast of the soap opera Neighbours, playing the role of Nathan Packard.

In 2022, he played Reuben Knox in the film Girl at the Window. Also that year he joined Netflix teen drama series Surviving Summer, playing the character Trav Morphett. In 2023, Gallagher played the role of Winston Strong in Amazon Freevee show Almost Paradise in the episode titled "Uncoupled".

In 2025, Gallagher portrayed Tony in an episode of Network 10's NCIS: Sydney and then he played the role of T in the short film, Thoughts & Prayers. Gallagher then played the role of Gaius Julius Caesar in the Starz network drama series, Spartacus: House of Ashur. It is a sequel to Spartacus and Gallagher took over the role from Todd Lasance, who was unavailable to reprise the role and the show's creator, Steven DeKnight decided to recast it. He also took the main role of billionaire winemaker Jack McLachlan in the film Beauty From Pain, an adaptation of Georgia Cates' 2013 novel of the same name. That year he joined the cast of the drama series Imposter for 5 and Paramount.

== Filmography ==
=== Film ===
Year	Title	Role	Notes
2011	Lie Awake	He	Short film
2013	Patrick	Patrick	
2019	This Time, Maybe	Jamie	
2019	2099: The Soldier Protocol	Matthew Allen Mills	
2022	Girl at the Window	Reuben Knox	
2023	Six Months	Harrison	Short film
2024	My Melbourne	Chris	
2024	Essentially Painless	Suit	Short film
2025	Thoughts & Prayers	T	Short film
2025	Beauty From Pain	Jack Henry McLachlan	
2026	Beauty From Surrender	Jack Henry McLachlan	

=== Television ===
Year	Title	Role	Notes
2008–2009	The Saddle Club	Ashley 'Chewie' Becker	Regular role
2013–2016	Home and Away	Josh Barrett	Regular role
2016	Please Like Me	Kyle	Guest role
2017	The Doctor Blake Mysteries	Tamas Lupei	Guest role
2018	Wine: A Bottle Shared Is a Problem Halved	Bartender	Guest role
2018	Back in Very Small Business	Clay	Recurring role
2018–2019	Playing for Keeps	Connor Marrello	Regular role
2019	Glitch	Raf	Guest role
2020	Wentworth	Travis Kelly	Guest role
2020	Neighbours	Nathan Packard	Guest role
2022	Surviving Summer	Trav Morphett	Guest role
2023	Almost Paradise	Winston Strong	Guest role
2025	NCIS: Sydney	Tony	Guest role
2025	My Life Is Murder	Evan Maddox	Guest role
2025–2026	Spartacus: House of Ashur	Gaius Julius Caesar	Recurring role
2025	Imposter	Ian O'Rielly	Guest role
