= Gareth Williams (New Zealand actor) =

New Zealand actor (born 1984)

- Born: 13 July 1984 (age 42); Wellington, New Zealand
- Occupation: Actor
- Years active: 2005–present

Gareth Williams (born 13 July 1984) is a New Zealand born actor of television, film and theatre. He trained for a year with the Auckland Theatre Company at the prestigious Globe Theater in London. He then attained his Bachelor of Performing Arts at Toi Whakaari: New Zealand Drama School in 2006. Williams has since had television roles in Facelift (2007), This Is Not My Life (2009), Legend of the Seeker (2010), as well as some minor feature film roles.

He has gained recognition through musical theatre, receiving positive reviews for his role as William Kemmler in the Indian Ink production of The Dentist's Chair. Shannon Huse, reviewer for the New Zealand Herald, wrote "Gareth Williams is suitably cadaver scary as William Kemmler, the ghost of the first man to be executed by electric chair who haunts Albert. He gives a charismatic performance that includes two ghoulish songs."

He has also taken on such stage roles as Benvolio in Romeo and Juliet (2010) and 'The Balladeer' in 'Assassins' (2010).

Williams landed the supporting role of Vettius in Spartacus: Gods of the Arena (2011).

== Filmography ==
=== Film ===
Year	Title	Role	Notes
2008	Home by Christmas	George Webster	
2009	Separation City	German Bellhop	
2010	Rest for the Wicked	Young Frank	
2010	Bliss	Dougal	

=== Television ===
Year	Title	Role	Notes
2005	Seven Periods with Mr Gormsby	Waterboy	
2007	Facelift	George Bush	
2009	This Is Not My Life	Davo	Episodes 3, 4
2010	Legend of the Seeker	Young Thaddicus Zorander	"Vengeance" (S02E17)
2010	Spartacus: Gods of the Arena	Vettius	Series regular
2014	Coverband	Brett	"Noise Control" (S01E02)

== Awards ==
2010 – Best Comedy Show – Winner – Wellington Fringe Festival – The Lonesome Buckwhips

2010 – Billy T James Award – Nominee – The Lonesome Buckwhips

2009 – Best Newcomer – Winner – Metro Magazine
