= Spartacus: Vengeance =

Second season of television series

- Season 2
- Region 1 DVD cover
- Starring: Liam McIntyre; Manu Bennett; Peter Mensah; Craig Parker; Viva Bianca; Katrina Law; Dan Feuerriegel; Brett Tucker; Lucy Lawless; Nick E. Tarabay; Cynthia Addai-Robinson; Dustin Clare
- No. of episodes: 10

Release
- Original network: Starz
- Original release: January 27 – March 30, 2012

Season chronology
- ← Previous; Gods of the Arena Next → War of the Damned

Spartacus: Vengeance is the second season of the American television series Spartacus, a Starz television series, which follows Spartacus: Blood and Sand. It premiered on January 27, and concluded on March 30, 2012. Its story follows Spartacus (played by Liam McIntyre, who replaces Andy Whitfield in the role due to Whitfield's death), after he and his fellow gladiators kill their master Batiatus and escape from his ludus, or gladiatorial training school. Cast members and characters who return from the first season include Lucy Lawless as Lucretia, Peter Mensah as Oenomaus, Manu Bennett as Crixus, Dan Feuerriegel as Agron, Nick E. Tarabay as Ashur, Viva Bianca as Ilithyia, and Craig Parker as Gaius Claudius Glaber. Dustin Clare also reprises his role as Gannicus from Spartacus: Gods of the Arena, the prequel to Spartacus: Blood and Sand.

On June 6, 2012, Starz and Anchor Bay Entertainment announced the season would be released in DVD and Blu-ray Disc formats on September 11, 2012, in a three-disc set. It was then announced that a third and final season will start in 2013 and would be known as Spartacus: War of the Damned.

== Cast and characters ==
=== Main cast ===
==== Rebels ====
- Liam McIntyre as Spartacus – a Thracian slave who became a gladiator in the ludus of Quintus Batiatus. After the massacre at the House of Batiatus, Spartacus forms his own army and sets out to free the slaves of Rome. Sura's widower, Ilithyia's former enemy and one-night stand, and Mira's lover.
- Peter Mensah as Oenomaus – formerly Doctore; Batiatus' taskmaster and trainer of gladiators, he becomes a trusted ally to Spartacus and his rebel army.
- Manu Bennett as Crixus – "The Undefeated Gaul", he was Batiatus' top gladiator before Spartacus' arrival, and then became Spartacus' chief rival at the ludus, but is now the second-in-command of Spartacus rebel army. Lucretia's unwilling ex-lover and Naevia's lover.
- Katrina Law as Mira – a slave who aided in Spartacus's escape. Now a fierce fighter and Spartacus' lover. She trains the other rebels with the bow.
- Dan Feuerriegel as Agron – a German gladiator who was sold to Batiatus' ludus, he was the first to join Spartacus in his revolt, where his brother Duro died. He is now one of Spartacus' trusted warriors. Nasir's lover.
- Dustin Clare as Gannicus – a former champion gladiator from the ludus who won his freedom in the arena some years before Spartacus' arrival (see Spartacus: Gods of the Arena). He returned to Capua and joined Spartacus' rebel army.
- Cynthia Addai-Robinson as Naevia – a slave who was banished from the ludus before the revolt. Crixus' lover.
- Pana Hema Taylor as Nasir – a Syrian former body slave who becomes one of the rebels. Agron's lover.
- Brooke Williams as Aurelia – Varro's widow, one of Spartacus' only friends in the ludus, she is now grudgingly on the run with Spartacus' rebel army.
- Heath Jones as Donar – a German gladiator who becomes one of the chief warriors among the rebels.
- Ellen Hollman as Saxa – a German slave and warrior whom Agron frees. She is initially Mira's rival, but they eventually become friends.
- Barry Duffield as Lugo – a dim-witted, but courageous German warrior captured by the Romans and whom Agron frees.

==== Romans ====
- Lucy Lawless as Lucretia – Quintus Batiatus' widow, Crixus' ex-lover, Ashur's slave and unwilling lover, and Ilithyia's ex-best friend, who was seriously injured from the wound she had suffered at the hands of Crixus. Her recovery was presented to the people of Rome as proof of Lucretia's personal connection with the gods, allegedly garnering her the gift of prophecy.
- Viva Bianca as Ilithyia – Albinius' daughter, Glaber's wife, Spartacus' former enemy and one-sided love interest, and Lucretia's ex-best friend, who is now pregnant. She is resentful at being pulled back to Capua by Spartacus' rebellion. Ilithyia is later revealed to be pregnant with Spartacus' child; after their one-night stand.
- Craig Parker as Gaius Claudius Glaber – Ilithyia's husband and a praetor. Responsible for Spartacus' enslavement as a gladiator, he is now tasked with putting down the rebellion.
- Nick E. Tarabay as Ashur – a clever and scheming Syrian slave who narrowly escaped death during the massacre at the House of Batiatus. He is a now willing collaborator with the Romans to put down the slave rebellion and is Lucretia's co-conspirator. As with the previous series, his motivation for helping the Romans stems from greed and pure self-interest. After Ashur had realized that Lucretia does not truly see him as her equal or partner-in-crime, but as an expendable pawn, Ashur starts raping her, forcing Lucretia to become his slave and unwilling lover.
- Brett Tucker as Publius Varinius – Glaber's chief political rival and fellow praetor.
- Tom Hobbs as Seppius – a young Capua citizen of note. He wishes to strip the honor of capturing Spartacus from Glaber.
- Hanna Mangan-Lawrence as Seppia – Seppius' flirtatious younger sister and Gaius' lover.
- Luke Pegler as Marcus – Glaber's military tribune.
- Jason Hood as Cossutius – a wealthy man, who lives outside of Capua.

== Episodes ==
No. overall	No. in season	Title	Directed by	Written by	Original release date	Prod. code	US viewers (millions)
14	1	"Fugitivus"	Michael Hurst	Steven S. DeKnight	January 27, 2012	SPS201	1.39
In the weeks after their escape from the ludus, Spartacus and Crixus command and train their small troop of domestic slaves and gladiators, while making temporary accommodation in the sewers. Spartacus has thoughts only on vengeance against Glaber, while Crixus is motivated with finding his lost love Naevia. Glaber, now Praetor with the Roman Senate, is commanded by his father-in-law to return to Capua and put down Spartacus. Ilithyia, now pregnant, wants to stay in Rome, but Glaber demands she accompany him. Meanwhile, Crixus obtains information from a brothel owner to seek Naevia in the south. Spartacus sends Aurelia, wife of his late friend Varro, north to reunite her with her son. Glaber, Ilithyia and his soldiers return to Capua and take up residence in the ludus and are shocked to find Lucretia alive but seemingly insane and she remembers very little, to Ilithyia's relief. Elsewhere, Oenomaus (Doctore) remains estranged from Spartacus and Crixus and feels extremely guilty for helping destroy the House of Batiatus. He warns them of the strength of Glaber and the Romans. Crixus urges that they should all flee south as if they kill Glaber right now they will not be able to defeat the legions they will send due to their small numbers and lack of trained fighters. Spartacus goes on his own to kill Glaber in the town square, and discovers they have captured and mortally wounded Aurelia. Spartacus eventually breaks cover and engages Glaber and his soldiers in combat. Spartacus is assisted by Crixus and the Gladiators and they escape with Aurelia as well as kill or wound many Roman soldiers, but fail to kill Glaber who is only wounded on his left arm. Afterwards, Aurelia asks Spartacus to promise to stay away from her son before dying. Spartacus agrees with Crixus that they should march south to look for Naevia, as well as seek to free all slaves who come into their path.
15	2	"A Place in This World"	Jesse Warn	Brent Fletcher	February 3, 2012	SPS202	1.30
Spartacus and his band of Gladiators move south, and take an isolated villa owned by a wealthy Roman, who had Naevia for a short time before sending her further south. One of the slaves, a young male named Nasir, attempts to kill Spartacus in the night as he has lost his position due to Spartacus' actions. Spartacus chooses not to have Nasir killed, but decides to train him. Back in Capua, Lucretia is viewed as an Oracle due to her surviving Spartacus' massacre; in the marketplace Lucretia receives a note from a hooded stranger. Meanwhile, Oenomaus thinks back about his purchase from the Pits by Titus Lentulus Batiatus in his youth, where he eventually states his reason for living is the honor of Titus and his House. Oenomaus fights in the Pits hoping to be killed, but he is eventually taken to the villa before Glaber as Lucretia is performing a ritual to ask the Gods to aid Glaber against Spartacus. The hooded stranger is revealed to be Ashur, former nefarious right-hand man of Quintus Batiatus, who is working in secret with Lucretia.
16	3	"The Greater Good"	Brendan Maher	Tracy Bellomo	February 10, 2012	SPS203	1.40
Spartacus and crew free another band of slaves being sent for the dreaded Mines. A slaver with his dying breath tells Agron and Nasir that Naevia lives but is working the Mines. Agron, who believes an attempt to free Naevia would result in the death of all the Rebels, lies and tells Crixus that Naevia is dead. In Capua, Ashur tortures Oenomaus to get information on Spartacus and his men unsuccessfully. Lucretia tells Ashur to use other means to get Oenomaus to speak. Ashur reveals to Oenomaus his wife Melitta's affair with his closest friend Gannicus (see Spartacus: Gods of the Arena). Oenomaus in his disbelief inadvertently reveals the rebels' purpose of going south in search of Naevia. Glaber, focused on holding his status, neglects his wife Ilithyia. Meanwhile, Nasir can no longer bring himself to maintain Agron's lie and tells Crixus the truth. Agron takes his own group to make camp at Mt. Vesuvius. Spartacus, Crixus, and the others that remain go to the mines. Disguising themselves as slaves and guards, they infiltrate the mines in search of Naevia. However, Glaber had dispatched his soldiers to the mines, along with Ashur, and they arrive shortly afterward. After Ashur recognizes and slaughters two of Spartacus' men posing as guards, the soldiers enter the mines in pursuit. Crixus is briefly reunited with Naevia, but as they attempt to make their way out, the soldiers catch up with them. Crixus battles the soldiers so Naevia and the rebels can escape; Crixus fights courageously but is ultimately overwhelmed, with Ashur delivering the final blows which knock Crixus out cold.
17	4	"Empty Hands"	Mark Beesley	Allison Miller	February 17, 2012	SPS204	1.47
Very few rebels escape the rescue mission from the Mines alive. Spartacus will suffer to leave no one behind even if it means the death of them all. The Romans led by Glaber's Tribune Marcus are in hot pursuit, assisted by Ashur. The captured Crixus and two others are reunited with Oenomaus at the villa, where treachery abounds. Meanwhile, Glaber must ease the insult he gave to Varinius, a fellow Praetor; Ilithyia suggests a party in his honor. Young Seppia seeks advice from Lucretia on seeking her future husband and sets her sights on Varinius, much to Ilithyia's envy. Ilithyia, angered by the neglect of Glaber, forms a plan to have her marriage dissolved and take Varinius as her new husband. Crixus and Oenomaus are to be executed in the arena while another is tortured to death at the hands of the party goers. Spartacus' numbers dwindle in the forest as they are killed one by one by the pursuing Romans. By the final fight only Spartacus, Mira, Naevia and the wounded Nasir are left alive. During a combat encounter, Spartacus manages to wound Marcus. Marcus insists on persisting with pursuit, against the advice of Ashur. Ashur takes Marcus further into the forest, only to finish him off before Marcus can order his troops to continue hunting Spartacus. Back in Capua, Ilithyia outshines Seppia, who was unable to participate in the torture of the prisoner, and brokers a deal with Varinius for marriage if Senator Albinius (Ilithyia's father) dissolves her marriage. Ilithyia seeks out her father among the party only to find him in bed with Lucretia. Furious, Ilithyia attacks Lucretia, but Lucretia reveals she did it only to heal past wrongs she had done to Ilithyia and help her seek her future as Varinius' wife. Ilithyia, on hearing this, manages to stay her hand. Spartacus and Mira now stand as one as they see a horde of strangers approach in the sun's early light ready for a fight to the death, only to find it is Agron and the rest of the Rebels come to aid them.
18	5	"Libertus"	Rick Jacobson	Aaron Helbing & Todd Helbing	February 24, 2012	SPS205	1.56
A plan is hatched and brothers are reunited upon the sands in this episode. While searching a temple with a view to spend the night, Spartacus encounters Lucius, a Roman disillusioned with Rome because of the civil war Sulla waged years before. Lucius gives shelter and information to the Rebels, mainly that the rumors that abound are that Spartacus and the Rebels are finished and all but slaughtered. He informs Spartacus that three of the rebels will be executed in the arena and that one of them is Crixus. Spartacus, unwilling to forsake Crixus and wanting to send a message to the Romans, hatches a daring plan of rescue, where they will move in and take the arena in Capua. Meanwhile, Gannicus returns to Capua to give Oenomaus an honorable death in the arena, but unaware Oenomaus knows the truth of Gannicus' affair with Melitta. Elsewhere, Lucretia dissuades Ilithyia from aborting her child, though Ilithyia must be rid of the pregnancy if she will marry Varinius. However, Lucretia manages to convince Ilithyia to delay the abortion. Lucretia, through Ashur, reveals the abortion attempt to Glaber. Ilithyia admits upon confrontation that their love and marriage is over and reveals her plan to marry Varinius to Glaber. When the primus fight starts, Oenomaus viciously attacks Gannicus and Mira is tasked to set the arena on fire on its foundations. When the arena finally collapses and most of the spectators flee, Spartacus and Agron attack the remaining gladiators and guards and escape with Gannicus, Crixus and Oenomaus, but not before Spartacus throws a spear directly at Glaber and nicks his cheek. Glaber, the last to leave the pulvinus, chances upon Senator Albinius (Ilithyia's father) trapped beneath a fallen beam, but he does not save his father-in-law, instead killing him. Glaber finds Ilithyia and lies by telling her her father was killed by Spartacus and that they will remain married.
19	6	"Chosen Path"	Michael Hurst	Misha Green	March 2, 2012	SPS206	1.19
With the injured Oenomaus and Crixus rescued, the group returns to the fallen temple to regroup and re organize. Meanwhile, Glaber tests Ashur's loyalty, and through the passing of this test Ashur's status and pride is elevated, filled with his own sense of self-importance. Lucretia attempts to bring him to heel, but her efforts backfire as Ashur rapes her. Glaber, still angry and feeling the sting of betrayal, treats Ilithyia cruelly, in where she seeks casual comfort with Lucretia and schemes to win back Glaber's love. Glaber attempts to join forces with Seppius and his group of mercenaries, but is rebuffed yet again, resulting in the young Seppia being invited to the villa instead. Elsewhere, Gannicus scoffs at Spartacus and the rebels, feeling that they are fighting for a lost cause. Naevia, being haunted by her ordeal, is unable to show her love physically to Crixus, while he is unable to forgive Agron for lying about Naevia's death. Spartacus attempts to enlist Gannicus to the cause but Gannicus remains unconvinced. Lucius, the disillusioned Roman, seeks to aid in training the rebels who were once house slaves. Chadara would rather seek her place in the bed of another gladiator but is rebuffed. Also, Ashur is sent to recruit the most violent of former gladiators for Glaber's new plan. Oenomaus awakens and tells Gannicus that they were once brothers and the betrayal with Melitta is not easily forgotten or forgiven. The map on which Spartacus and Agron make their plans vanishes along with the last bit of money the rebels have. Gannicus is accused and a fight ensues between the former champions of Batiatus. The fight comes to a draw as Mira draws an arrow from her bow and shoots down Chadara who was attempting to flee with map and missing coins in hand. Gannicus also takes his leave. Back in Capua, Seppia, after some coaxing from Ilithyia, Lucretia and Glaber, agrees to speak with her brother, but to no avail since Glaber has already moved against Seppius. Along with Ashur's new recruits, Glaber slaughters Seppius and every other living being in the villa. Glaber takes his time delivering the final death blow to Seppius by stepping on his windpipe. Ashur then picks up Seppius' gold twin snake armlet with the intent on keeping it for himself. Glaber then blames the slaughter on Seppius' house slaves and claims they escaped to join the rebels cause.
20	7	"Sacramentum"	Jesse Warn	Seamus Kevin Fahey	March 9, 2012	SPS207	1.25
In the port city of Neapolis, Spartacus, Agron, and Lucius pose as rich Romans interested in buying a new shipment of slaves, all of whom hail from the Germanic tribes of the north. Complications arise when Agron speaks to the slaves in their mother tongue and is overheard by a Roman guard who also shares their tongue and raises the alarm, but the operation succeeds despite this and the rebel army swells with Agron's distant kin. This alarms Crixus and Lucius, given the possibility that these new recruits may not follow Spartacus' orders in favor of Agron. Meanwhile in Capua, Glaber enlists the former mercenary band that belonged to young Seppius, and they pledge the Sacramentum to Glaber and to Rome. After Ashur raping Lucretia again, he believes she is beginning to have romantic feelings for him and he presents her with a red wig like she used to wear as a symbol of her belonging to him. Ganniucus, prompted by Ashur, goes to the villa for an audience with Glaber, where he offers Gannicus the chance to be a beacon of hope, the front man to his army. Glaber also returns Gannicus' rudus. Ilithyia, growing ever more desperate that Glaber will never forgive her, wishes she were dead. Lucretia however comes up with a plan for Ilithyia to break free of Glaber's hatred and vengeful attitude and go home to Rome. The plan involves Lucretia fooling Glaber into thinking Ilithyia needs to go to Rome in order for the gods to bless their unborn child. After a failed attempt to bond with the new recruits on a hunting trip, which turns into highway robbery as the new recruits accost a wagon on the road, Spartacus, Crixus, and Lucius wonder whether Agron's loyalty lies with his kinsmen or with Spartacus. A great feast turns into a bloody battle after Seddulus, the biggest of all the new recruits tries to rape Naevia, after which Naevia stabs him and calls for help. Agron decides this has gone too far and helps Crixus and Spartacus control the German. Spartacus, asserting his authority as leader, fights Seddulus and brutally kills him. After witnessing the gruesome scene, Agron's tribesmen swear allegiance to Spartacus. Lucretia and Gannicus meet in the market, where Gannicus mourns for his friend from the brothel who is now crucified for merely whispering about Spartacus' fight for freedom for all. Lucretia tempts Gannicus with a plan to kill Glaber and end this conflict. Ilithyia is packed off to Rome, but not before Lucretia reveals the plan to her. Ilithyia kisses Glaber goodbye. No more than a few hours in her absence Glaber has sex with Seppia, when unfortunate news reaches him that Ilithyia's wagon was viciously attacked on the road to Rome. All that is in the wagon is one of Ashur's henchmen with Gannicus' rudus sticking out of his neck. Ashur states Gannicus has made his choice.
21	8	"Balance"	Chris Martin-Jones	Jed Whedon	March 16, 2012	SPS208	1.10
Gannicus leads the captive Ilithyia to the rebel camp. Ilithyia, pleading for her life and the life of her unborn child, reveals to Spartacus that the child she carries is not Glaber's, but his own child, conceived the night that Lucretia tricked her into laying with Spartacus. Ilithyia tries to convince Lucius to send word to Capua of her whereabouts, however, Spartacus enlists him to deliver a message to Glaber. Mira, moved by jealousy, attempts to save Spartacus the burden of killing Ilithyia, but is stopped short. Meanwhile, Glaber and Ashur scour the town for clues about where Gannicus has taken Ilithyia, laying waste to every brothel, with Ashur collecting goods from every corpse. Lucretia tries to bring to bare with Seppia but gets nowhere, and turning to Ashur for help. But Lucretia notices while being raped that among Ashur's horde of jewels and gold is dead Seppius' gold twin snake armlet. About to confront Seppia with the news of Glaber being responsible for her brother's death, they are interrupted by Lucius and his message from Spartacus. The message is that in exchange for a wagon filled with arms and armor, the Rebels will release Ilithyia. Glaber appears to agree to the terms. At the agreed time and place, Glaber meets Spartacus with the wagon. After a heated exchange of words by hero and villain, treachery is revealed and the wagon is filled with Ashur and his mercenary band, including a burly and lethal Egyptian warrior, and an all-out battle occurs. Lucius is killed, but Spartacus and most of his men escape, and Glaber returns to Capua without Ilithyia. Lucretia finally reveals the depth of Glaber's vengeance and murderous deeds to Seppia. At the end, Spartacus releases Ilithyia in the woods after revealing to her that Glaber had no intention of saving her.
22	9	"Monsters"	TJ Scott	Brent Fletcher	March 23, 2012	SPS209	1.35
Spartacus finds anger, resentment and mistrust in his ranks and must see old wounds healed if the Rebels are to stand against the might of Rome. Ilithyia returns home to find Seppia (although unwilling) in the arms of Glaber. From Ilithyia's information on the Rebels' location, Ashur pinpoints the site of their temple base, and as reward he is promised his freedom after the defeat of Spartacus. Ilithyia and Glaber also have a heart-to-heart talk, and Ilithyia finds Glaber not moved from her miraculous survival. However, Lucretia is quite happy and tells Ilithyia of the latest happenings and of Glaber's murder of Seppius, and Ilithyia and Lucretia set young Seppia on a path of vengeance. Meanwhile, rounds of friendly bouts to end current grievances are set up by Spartacus, as old insults and past wrongs are put right in these friendly battles. Ashur reveals to Lucretia that as well as freedom, Glaber will give Ashur the ludus and his blessing of marriage with Lucretia if Spartacus falls in the upcoming battle. Lucretia is quite dismayed at the loss of her husband's legacy. Varinius returns to Capua (at the secret bidding of Seppia) with directions from the Senate that Glaber is to leave Capua and return to Rome. Varinius is rebuffed by Glaber, and warns of further ruin if Glaber does not obey. Varinius is angered at Seppia's lack of strong evidence of Glaber's wrongdoings and murderous deeds. Lucretia gives a final pep talk to convince Seppia to make attempt on Glaber's life. At the final moment before Seppia's dagger is thrust into Glaber, Ilithyia, from behind, grabs Seppia's dagger, stabs Seppia in her heart and proceeds to violently slit her throat. Glaber and Ilithyia come to a mutual understanding about their marriage, as Ilithyia fuels passion with ambitious talk of power that they both must seek to acquire. The Roman attack on the Rebel temple goes forward, Varinius' and Glaber's forces in attendance. Spartacus and Gannicus capture Varinius in the first assault, catching him unaware in the forest. In the temple forecourt, whoever mostly remained of Varinius' frontal assault lay dead, but then huge fire projectiles are hurled into the temple. Varinius is hit by a projectile and is killed. Glaber, his men and Ashur storm the temple. Overrun, Spartacus and the rebels use their escape tunnels to leave, but not before Oenomaus loses his left eye while fighting the fierce Egyptian mercenary and losses of at least half of the Rebels. Cutting Glaber off from pursuit, the Rebels exit the tunnels only to have their retreat cut off by the rest of Glaber's forces. With no other path that does not lead to certain death, the Rebels take to the steep mountain paths of Mt. Vesuvius. Glaber halts further pursuit and decides to besiege the mountain, hoping to force the rebels to come out in the open, driven by hunger and thirst. Glaber states that Spartacus and his followers will die.
23	10	"Wrath of the Gods"	Jesse Warn	Steven S. DeKnight	March 30, 2012	SPS210	1.45
Spartacus and most of his followers stand on the mountain paths of the lower slopes of Mt. Vesuvius pondering their next move. Some of his followers attempt to ambush several Roman soldiers guarding the mountain, including Ashur and the Egyptian mercenary. The ambush fails but some of the rebels, led by Spartacus, arrive to save their companions and a battle breaks out. Mira is killed by an axe meant for Spartacus. Meanwhile, Lucretia and a pregnant Ilithyia travel to Mt. Vesuvius where Ilithyia has a conversation with Glaber that convinces him that Ashur was working with Seppia to kill him, and suggest that he get rid of Ashur. Glaber agrees with her and in return asks Ilithyia to murder Lucretia because her role as oracle serves no purpose anymore, and this task will win his trust. Glaber bribes Ashur's soldiers to betray the troublesome Ashur and then forces him to go on a suicide mission to prove himself, confronting Spartacus and his followers alone and bargaining for their surrender. Ashur's offer is declined when he reveals that Spartacus will be killed upon surrender and his followers would once again become slaves. Ashur begins to depart when Crixus suggests that they execute him. Spartacus agrees with this and Naevia convinces Crixus to allow her to fight him. After a protracted duel, Naevia decapitates Ashur. Spartacus comes up with a plan to ambush the Roman encampment. They weave rappelling vines and Spartacus, Agron, Crixus, and Gannicus descend down the mountain behind the Roman guards. At the bottom of their descent, they take control of the siege weapons to set fire to the camp and leave the legion in disarray. The rest of the rebels join in the battle, attacking from the side. Meanwhile, before Ilithyia is able to push Lucretia from the ludus' balcony her water breaks. At first Lucretia is pretending to help Ilithyia deliver her baby but after killing Ilithyia's slaves, Lucretia cuts Ilithyia's newborn son from her womb and commits suicide by jumping off the ludus' cliff with the baby in her arms. Ilithyia, witnessing all this, collapses and dies from shock and loss of blood. The battle between Glaber's forces and the rebels rages on and Oenomaus and Gannicus battle the Egyptian gladiator. Gannicus manages to kill the Egyptian mercenary but Oenomaus is fatally wounded and dies in Gannicus's arms. Spartacus has a one-on-one sword fight with Glaber. When Spartacus wounds and bests his rival, Glaber defiantly boasts that his death and the destruction of his legion will bring many more legions of Roman soldiers after them and the rebels will never win in the long run. In equal defiant response, Spartacus shoves his sword down Glaber's throat, killing him. Spartacus and the surviving rebels proceed to celebrate their victory.

== Production ==
Spartacus series creator Steven S. DeKnight said in an interview, There are a "couple of very strong candidates" for the role of Spartacus, and season two should begin production in New Zealand in April [2011]. DeKnight added that the Spartacus producers and Starz executives weren't always sure they would go forward without Andy Whitfield, who they said had brought "gravity and heart" to the role of the famous warrior. "It's unheard of to recast your titular character in a television show, and we did a lot of soul searching about whether we even wanted to try", DeKnight said. "And then Andy [Whitfield] said, 'I really think the show should go forward without me. I give you the blessing. I want this story told.'"

On 17 January 2011, it was announced that Australian film and TV actor Liam McIntyre had been selected to replace Whitfield.

On 26 February 2011 interview with Entertainment Weekly, DeKnight revealed that the second season was set to air "the end of January" 2012. Additionally, he revealed that Lesley-Ann Brandt, the actress who portrayed the slave Naevia, would also not be able to return for season 2 due to the delay in production.

On 1 August 2011, Starz released a trailer indicating the new series would premiere in January 2012.

== Broadcast ==
On November 7, 2011, Starz announced that the Spartacus premiere date was set for January 27, 2012.

== Home video release ==
Spartacus - Vengeance: Season 2
Set Details	Special Features
10 Episodes; 3-Disc Set; Audio Commentaries (Blu-ray); Extended Episodes (Blu-ray)	Starz Studios - Spartacus: Vengeance; The Making Of Spartacus: Vengeance; Behind The Camera: Directing The Rebellion; On The Set With Liam McIntyre; Burning Down The House: The VFX of Episode 205; The Legend of Spartacus; Famous Last Words; Bloopers; Spartacus: War of the Damned teaser
Release Dates
Region 1	Region 2
September 11, 2012	5 October 2012
