= Publius Varinius =

Roman general and senator

- Born: 110 BC

Publius Varinius (born circa 110 BC) was a Roman praetor in 73 BC, proconsul in 72 BC, and a military commander who was unsuccessful during the Third Servile War.

The historical account of his involvement in the Third Servile War is incomplete, but it is known that an advance force of 2,000 led by his legate, Lucius Furius, was defeated, with Furius being killed in action, and that a later encounter also ended in the defeat of another 4,000 men.

There is a 'Publius Varinius' recorded as holding the office of Governor of the province of Asia in 65 BC, but it is unknown if it is the same Publius Varinius as the Roman Praetor.

== Portrayals in film or television ==
Varinius, played by Australian actor Brett Tucker, is a secondary antagonist in the Starz series Spartacus: Vengeance. The character version of Varinius is a military and political figure of some importance, holding the rank of praetor, like Glaber (Craig Parker); as such, due to the competitive nature of Roman politics, the two are rivals. Glaber is constantly at odds with Varinius and eventually sees him killed by a flaming stone shot from a catapult during an attack on Spartacus.

Varinius was portrayed by Niall Refoy in the 2004 miniseries Spartacus. He was renamed as Publius Maximus.

== Selected ancient sources ==
- Sallust, Histories 3.95-98 Maurenbrecher.
- Frontinus, Strategemata 1.5.22.
- Plutarch, Crassus 9.4-6.
- Appian, Civil Wars 1.116.
- Florus, Epitome 2.8.5 (Varinius is the unnamed general whose camp was attacked)
- The Spartacus War by Barry Strauss

== Bibliography ==
- Bradley, Keith. Slavery and Rebellion in the Roman World. Bloomington: Indiana University Press, 1989, pp. 95–96. ISBN 0-253-31259-0
- Broughton, T. Robert S. "Magistrates of the Roman Republic." Vol. 2. Cleveland: Case Western University Press, 1968, p. 110 & 119.
