= Barry Duffield =

Australian actor and director

- Born: 28 February 1962 (age 64); Billingham, England
- Occupations: Actor, producer, scriptwriter, director
- Years active: 1987–present

Barry Duffield (born 28 February 1962) is an Australian actor, producer, scriptwriter and director from Billingham, England. He is mostly known for his portrayal of Lugo in the Starz television series Spartacus.

== Early life ==
Born 28 February 1962 in Billingham, England, Barry Duffield moved to Australia with his family in 1968 where they finally settled in Nhulunbuy in the north of the country.

He studied at the Woodridge North State School until 1972, and then at the Nhulunbuy Area School until 1979. From 1997 to 1998, he chose the South Seas Film and Television School of New Zealand to improve his skills in writing and direction. At the end of it he got his first and only diploma.

He married Susan Flemming, whom he met in 1996, on 26 September 1999. They live together in Auckland.

His first steps in movie making was when he took his father's 8mm camera to shoot a short film in stop motion with dance and singing which he called Salt'N'Pepper shaker show.

Later on, Barry was caught in the act of stealing movie posters from a cinema. The cinema projectionist, David, gave him a choice between calling his parents, the police, or working for the posters he was stealing. He chose to work in the cinema where he had the chance to learn the profession of projectionist.

He also worked for the Australian [Royal Air Force] from May 1980 to May 1993 in the Police Dog Section {Rank of Corporal on discharge}.

== Career ==
Barry started his acting career in 1987 in Darwin, Australia and continued it in Brisbane where he played in Australia's Most Wanted, a reality crime TV series and in the film No Escape in 1994.

Then, he went to New Zealand where he acted in numerous TV shows like Young Hercules in the role of Maximus, Hercules: The Legendary Journeys playing Kazankis and Xena: Warrior Princess in 1998 with Lucy Lawless in the main role, who he later acted alongside in Spartacus.

In 2004, he played the Dr Poulton in the second movie Treasure Island Kids called The Monster of Treasure Islands.

In 2010, he played the voice of a bodyguard in Yogi Bear with Justin Timberlake.

In 2012, he joined the cast of Spartacus in the second season, Spartacus : Vengeance, in which he played the German warrior Lugo who helped Spartacus in the rebellion against the Romans.

In 2013, he reprised the character of Lugo in the third and last season of Spartacus, Spartacus : War of the Damned.

In 2014, he acted in the drama of Peter Burger Field Punishment N°1 in the role of Dunkirk Warder.

Since 1988, he has been a part of the Robert Bruce Agency which represents TV shows, cinema and theater actors.

Since 2000, he has been a director and a screenwriter for DreamChaser productions.

In 2009, he was selected in the New Zealand Film Commission First Writers Initiative and is a part of The New Zealand Writers Guild Board as a representative of the north of the country.

Barry is also the author of two comic books: Deadman's Land for which he was the quarter-finalist of the Big Break Screenwriting Contest in 2013, and, still quarter finalist, but this time in 2014, of Scriptapalooza Screenwriting. His second comic book is called Tandoori Apocalypse and a new one is set to be released in 2017.

In a June 2023 interview that can be heard on Reality Hub, at the 42:15 mark, Barry said "I ended up getting to a point where I couldn't audition anymore because I got jab injured."

== Filmography ==
=== Television ===
- 1994 : Australia's Most Wanted
- 1998 : Young Hercules : Maximus
- 1998 : Hercule : Kazankis
- 1998 : Xena: Warrior Princess : Koryak
- 2012 : Spartacus: Vengeance : Lugo
- 2013 : Spartacus: War of the Damned : Lugo
- 2019 : Power Rangers Beast Morphers : Cycletron
- 2021 : Power Rangers Dino Fury : Smashstone

=== Film ===
- 1994 : No Escape : prison guard
- 2004 : Treasure Island Kids : The Monster of Treasure Islands : Dr Poulton
- 2014 : Field Punishment N°1 : Dunkirk Warder

=== Voix ===
- 2010 : Yogi bear : bodyguard

== Bibliography ==
=== Bandes-dessinées ===
- 2014 : Deadman's Land
- 2015 : Tandoori Apocalypse
