= Gwendoline Taylor =

New Zealand actress

- Born: 7 November 1987 (age 38)
- Occupation: Actress
- Years active: 2007–present
- Spouse: Jeff McTainsh (m. 2016)

Gwendoline Taylor (born 7 November 1987) is a New Zealand actress and post-production editor. She first appeared on screen in 2007 in Show of Hands, which was filmed in her hometown of New Plymouth.

== Career ==
In 2008, Taylor moved to Auckland to study post-production at South Seas Film & Television School. However, she instead started an acting career, as her tutors thought her well-suited for such. In 2012, she was cast as Sibyl in Spartacus: War of the Damned, a television series on the Starz network. She has made a number of appearances in short films and on the series Go Girls and Nothing Trivial. Her other film credits include a featured role as Emily in Sione's 2: Unfinished Business, the sequel to Sione's Wedding. In 2015 she was cast as Angelica in the New Zealand film Someone to Carry Me.

Taylor served as Post-Supervisor for the 2022 television series Lord of the Rings: The Rings of Power.
