= List of French military leaders =

Key: Identity
Gallic
Breton
Frankish
Norman
French

The following is a list of famous French military leaders from the Gauls to modern France. The list is necessarily subjective and incomplete.

Famous French Military Leaders (ordered chronologically)
Portrait	Name	Years	Identity	Notes
	Brennus	4th century BC	Gallic	Chieftain of the Senones. Famous for his victory over the Roman forces at the Battle of the Allia and the subsequent sack of Rome.
	Brennus	3rd century BC (died 279 BC)	Gallic	(Do not confuse with his homonym) One of the Gallic leaders during the Gallic invasion of the Balkans. Notably famous for his victory at Thermopylae and the sacking of Delphi.
	Divico	2nd century BC	Gallic	Leader of the Helvetian tribe, Divico defeated a Roman army and killed its leaders Lucius Cassius Longinus and Lucius Calpurnius Piso Caesoninus during the Battle of Burdigala.
	Oenomaus	1st century BC (died 73/72 BC)	Gallic	Gallic gladiator of Capua and leader during the Third Servile War.
	Crixus	1st century BC (died 72 BC)	Gallic	Firstly known as gladiator in Capua, the most famous of the leaders along with Spartacus during the Third Servile War.
	Gannicus	1st century BC (died 71 BC)	Gallic	Gallic slave, he became leader of a slave army along with Spartacus and fellow Gauls Crixus, Oenomaus and Castus during the Third Servile War.
	Castus	1st century BC (died 71 BC)	Gallic	Another Gallic slave, and co-commander along with Gannicus during the Third Servile War.
	Vercingetorix	c. 82-46 BC	Gallic	Chieftain of the Arverni tribe; he united the Gauls in a revolt against Roman forces under Julius Caesar. After his notable victory at Gergovia, he was finally defeated at Alesia.
	Postumus	3rd century (died 269)	Gallic	Gallo-Roman general and then emperor of the Gallic Empire. Postumus campaigns against the Franks and Alemanni in 262 and 263 were so successful that Germanic raids stopped for a decade and the title of Germanicus maximus was given to him.
	Riothamus	c. 440-510	Breton	‘High King’ of the Britons in Gaul. Ally of the Roman Emperor Anthemius, Riothamus brought 12,000 soldiers to support the Romans against the Visigoths. Betrayed by Arvandus and ambushed at Déols c. 470 by Euric, Riothamus gathered the battle’s survivors and escaped to the land of the Burgundians.
	Clovis	c. 466-511	Frankish	Successful leader of the Franks who quadrupled Frankish territory.
	Charles Martel	686-741	Frankish	Famous victor at the Battle of Tours in 732. The Christian triumph has captured the Western imagination ever since.
	Roland	8th century (died 778)	Frankish	Count Roland was Charlemagne's commander on the Breton border and regarded as his very best warrior. His bravery was immortalized through modern-day France, Italy and Germany in medieval culture.
	Charlemagne	742/747-814	Frankish	Charlemagne established the strongest central administration in the Western world since the fall of the Western Roman Empire in 476.
	Odo of France	c. 852–898	French	Count of Paris and then King of Western Francia. Along with 200 men-at-arms, Odo successfully defended Paris for months against tens of thousands of Vikings from 885 to 886.
	William the Conqueror	1028–1087	Norman	William, Duke of Normandy, won the Kingdom of England by conquest. The Norman Conquest tore England away from the Scandinavian sphere of influence and brought it to the French sphere of influence. The successors of William held extensive lands in France, challenging the authority of the French kings.
	Raymond IV, Count of Toulouse	c. 1041–1105	French	Perhaps the most powerful leader of the First Crusade, he distinguished himself at the Siege of Antioch in 1098. After the success of the crusade, Raymond refused to rule over the Kingdom of Jerusalem.
	Baldwin I of Jerusalem	c. 1058–1118	French	Godfrey of Bouillon's older brother, Baldwin of Boulogne was the second ruler and first king of Jerusalem. One of the leaders of the First Crusade, as king he expanded the kingdom with the captures of Arsuf, Caesarea and Sidon.
	Godfrey of Bouillon	1060–1100	French	The most popular leader of the First Crusade, he became the first ruler of the Kingdom of Jerusalem after the successful siege of 1099. He was made Advocatus Sancti Sepulchri ("advocate" or "defender of the Holy Sepulchre") after Raymond IV refused it.
	Baldwin II of Jerusalem	1060–1131	French	As king of Jerusalem, Baldwin of Rethel defeated a much larger Seljuq force at the Battle of Azaz.
	Hugues de Payens	c. 1070–1136	French	Co-founder and first Grand Master of the Knights Templar.
	Eustace Grenier	c. 1071–1123	French	Crusader lord, involved in the Battle of Ramla and the siege of Tripoli, Eustace defeated an Egyptian invasion at the Battle of Yibneh.
	Balian of Ibelin	c. 1143–1193	French	Famous for the defence of Jerusalem against Saladin.
	Baldwin of Antioch	Unknown-1176	French	General in service of the Byzantine Empire, one of the most trusted Emperor's advisors in his battles against the Seljuk Turks, he died at the Battle of Myriokephalon during a cavalry charge.
	William of Champlitte	c. 1160–1209	French	Leader of the great Crusader victory at the Battle of the Olive Grove of Koundouros during the Fourth Crusade.
	Philip II Augustus	1165–1223	French	Under his leadership, the French won at the Battle of Bouvines against the combined forces of England, Flanders and the Holy Roman Empire in 1214; France emerged as the most powerful state in Europe.
	Louis VIII the Lion	1187–1226	French	After his victory at the Battle of Roche-au-Moine (1214), he invaded southern England and was proclaimed "King of England" before being repelled. His reign is marked by his intervention with royal forces into the Albigensian Crusade in southern France which decisively moved the conflict towards a conclusion.
	Louis IX of France	1214–1270	French	The most powerful European ruler in his time, regarded as "primus inter pares", first among equals, among the kings and rulers of the continent. King Louis IX firstly distinguished himself against Henry III of England at Taillebourg, winning the Saintonge War and defeating Plantagenets pretensions to take over former continental possessions. Then Louis IX took an active part in the Seventh and Eighth Crusade in which he died from dysentery.
	Charles of Anjou	1227–1285	French	Younger brother of Louis IX of France and Alfonso II of Toulouse. He won the Kingdom of Sicily by conquest after his victory at Benevento.
	Bertrand du Guesclin	c. 1320–1380	French	Carried out a wonderful ten-year campaign (1370–1380) during the second phase of the Hundred Years' War that saw the French recapture nearly all of the territory lost under the Treaty of Brétigny.
	La Hire	c. 1390–1443	French	Most famous for leading the French vanguard in the spectacular victory at Patay.
	Jean Bureau	c. 1390–1463	French	French artillery commander during the later years of the Hundred Years' War, Jean Bureau aided in the French victory at Formigny and commanded the victorious French army at the decisive Battle of Castillon that saw the last English troops pushed out of France and ensured French victory in the war.
	Joan of Arc	1412–1431	French	Turned the tide of the Hundred Years' War by leading the French to victory at the famous Siege of Orléans.
	Arthur III, Duke of Brittany	1393-1458	Breton	Constable of France and step-brother of Henry V of England. A French commander at Agincourt, where he was severely wounded. Rode beside Joan of Arc at the Battle of Patay. Seized power in a bloodless coup at the instigation of Yolande of Aragon in 1433. Used his Burgundian connections to arrange the Treaty of Arras (1435). Reformed the French Kingdom’s finances and army, and created the Ordonnances. Led Breton cavalry in the decisive intervention in the Battle of Formigny.
	Pierre d'Aubusson	1423–1505	French	40th Grand Master of the Order of Malta, Pierre d'Aubusson successfully defended the city of Rhodes in 1480 against a large invasion force of the Ottoman Empire.
	Philippe Villiers de L'Isle-Adam	1464–1534	French	44th Grand Master of the Order of Malta, Philippe Villiers resisted for 6 month with 7,500 troops against 200,000 Ottomans at the Siege of Rhodes.
	Chevalier Bayard	1473–1524	French	"The knight without fear and beyond reproach". Bayard distinguished himself in many battles during the Italian Wars such as Fornovo, Agnadello and Ravenna, but his greatest achievement probably is the successful defence of Mezière along with 1,000 French soldiers facing 30,000 soldiers of the Imperial army under Charles V.
	Gaston de Foix	1489–1512	French	Remembered for the great French victory at the Battle of Ravenna in 1512, where he also died.
	Jean Parisot de Valette	1495–1568	French	The most illustrious Grand Master of the Order of Malta for commanding the resistance against the Ottomans at the Great Siege of Malta in 1565. Valletta the capital of Malta is named after him.
	Pontus De la Gardie	c. 1520–1585	French	French nobleman and general in the service of Denmark and Sweden. De la Gardie was the most renowned military commander in Sweden during the 16th century.
	Henry III of France	1551–1589	French	In his young age, Henry led the royal army at Jarnac, Moncontour and La Rochelle during the French Wars of Religion until he was crowned King of Poland & Grand Duke of Lithuania and later King of France.
	Henry IV of France	1553–1610	French	Succeeding to the throne at a low point in the history of the French monarchy, Henry IV's victories over the forces of Spain and the Catholic League restored stability and royal power, ending the French wars of religion.
	Jacques-Nompar de Caumont	1558–1662	French	Marshal of France under Henry IV, Jacques-Nompar de Caumont distinguished himself for his conquests in Piedmont and Lorraine.
	Cardinal Richelieu	1585–1642	French	French clergyman, noble and statesman. Known for commanding the Siege of La Rochelle and his great military reforms to contest the Habsburg power.
	Antoine d'Aumont de Rochebaron	1601–1669	French	Captain of the King's Guards and Marshal of France, Antoine d'Aumont participated in many campaigns of the king Louis XIV and played an important role at the Battle of Rethel.
	Abraham Duquesne	c. 1610–1688	French	French naval officer. After a short service in the Swedish Navy, Duquesne became most famous for his fight against Michiel de Ruyter and his combined fleet of the United Provinces and Spain at Stromboli and Augusta.
	D'Artagnan	c. 1611–1673	French	D'Artagnan was the most popular member of the Musketeers of the Guard in which he served as captain.
	Turenne	1611–1675	French	One of the greatest commanders of all time, Turenne dominated the battlefields of Europe for several decades throughout the 17th century. His death at Sasbach in 1675 was universally mourned.
	Jean Armand de Maillé-Brézé	1619–1646	French	Perhaps the most talented admiral France ever had. His repeated victories over Spain confirmed French naval dominance in the Mediterranean until his premature death at 27 years old.
	The Great Condé	1621–1686	French	He and Turenne were the dynamic duo that carried French armies to victory after victory during the reign of Louis XIV. His victory at the Battle of Rocroi in 1643 ushered a new era in military history, with cavalry attaining an operational importance unseen since the Middle Ages.
	François de Créquy	1625–1697	French	Distinguished during the siege of Lille in 1667, François de Créquy was, along with Turenne and The Great Condé, one of the foremost French military commanders of the 17th century and the pattern of the younger generals of the stamp of Luxembourg and Villars.
	Maréchal Luxembourg	1628–1695	French	Shined during the Nine Years' War, leading French armies to famous triumphs at Fleurus and Landen, among others.
	Vauban	1633–1707	French	Arguably the greatest military engineer of all time, Vauban restructured the French defensive system so thoroughly that France became almost impregnable for much of the 17th and 18th centuries.
	Nicolas Catinat	1637–1712	French	Most famous for his decisive victories over the Duke of Savoy at Staffarda and Marsaglia during the Nine Years' War before to be outmanoeuvred by Prince Eugene of Savoy during the War of the Spanish Succession.
	Anne Hilarion de Tourville	1642–1701	French	French naval commander who served under King Louis XIV. Tourville is mostly known for his victory at the Battle of Beachy Head during the Nine Years' War.
	Anne Jules de Noailles	1650–1708	French	Commander of the French army in Spain during the War of the Grand Alliance and the War of the Spanish Succession. Following his victory at Torroella, duc de Noailles took Palamós, Girona, Hostalric and Castellfollit de la Roca.
	Claude Louis Hector de Villars	1653–1734	French	The last great general of Louis XIV, Villars saved France from disaster at Denain during the War of the Spanish Succession recovering most of French territorial losses.
	Louis Joseph, Duke of Vendôme	1654–1712	French	Regarded as a remarkable soldier, as skilled and innovative in leadership as particularly brave in combat. Worthy antagonist to Prince Eugène of Savoy, Louis Joseph count numerous notable victories such as Cassano, Villaviciosa, among others in his military career.
	Pierre Le Moyne d'Iberville	1661–1706	French	French soldier and explorer, founder of French Louisiana, d'Iberville is famous for his numerous victories over the English in the New World. The most famous one was the Battle of Hudson's Bay.
	James FitzJames, 1st Duke of Berwick	1670–1734	French	Anglo-French military leader, the Duke of Berwick is famous for his victory at Almansa described as "probably the only Battle in history in which the English forces were commanded by a Frenchman, the French by an Englishman". Frederick II of Prussia referred later to Almansa as "the most scientific battle of our century".
	François-Marie, 1st duc de Broglie	1671–1745	French	Marshal of France, duc de Broglie fought in Italy during the War of the Polish Succession where he won the Battle of Parma and Guastalla.
	Marquis de Maillebois	1682–1762	French	Conqueror of Corsica in 1739, Maillebois won the Battle of Bassignano and the Battle of Rottofreddo in Italy during the War of the Austrian Succession.
	Louis Charles César Le Tellier	1695–1771	French	Distinguished at Fontenoy, Le Tellier invaded Hanover following his victory at Hastenbeck during the Seven Years' War.
	Maurice de Saxe	1696–1750	French	Maurice de Saxe was one of the foremost commanders of the 18th century, especially renowned for his brilliant campaign in the War of the Austrian Succession, which led to the capture of Maastricht in 1748.
	Comte de Lowendal	1700–1755	French	Danish, German-born French soldier, Lowendal served in many armies before devoting allegiance to Louis XV. He is, along with Maurice de Saxe, the best example of foreign soldiers who performed in the French army. He led French forces that captured Ghent in 1745 and Bergen-op-Zoom in 1747 during the War of the Austrian Succession.
	Louis-Joseph de Montcalm-Gozon	1712–1759	French	Louis-Joseph de Montcalm was a French military leader best known as the commander of the forces in North America during the Seven Years' War (whose North American theatre is called the French and Indian War in the United States).
	Marc René, marquis de Montalembert	1714–1800	French	Veteran of the War of the Polish Succession and War of the Austrian Succession, marquis de Montalembert is one of the world most renowned military engineers for his work on fortifications.
	Louis François, Prince of Conti	1717–1776	French	Prince of blood, the Prince of Conti distinguished himself in the early War of the Austrian Succession in which he shared victories at Villafranca and Madonna dell'Olmo along with Philip of Spain. Conti also won the Battle of Casteldelfino by his single leadership.
	Comte de Grasse	1723–1788	French	Famous for his victory over the Royal Navy at Chesapeake during the Yorktown campaign.
	Comte de Rochambeau	1725–1807	French	Orchestrator of the Yorktown campaign which led to the surrender of Lord Cornwallis during the American Revolutionary War.
	Louis-René Levassor de Latouche Tréville	1745–1804	French	Perhaps the most reliable naval commander Napoleon ever had, Tréville repeatedly proved his abilities by beating off Nelson's attacks on the French fleet.
	Jean Baptiste Kléber	1753–1800	French	Talented general under Napoleon. Kléber won impressive victories during the expedition to Egypt such as Mount Tabor and Heliopolis until his assassination in Cairo.
	Gilbert du Motier, Marquis de Lafayette	1757–1834	French	One of the most recognizable French personages during the American Revolutionary War, Lafayette was instrumental in convincing the French government to intervene on behalf of the colonies, providing the blueprint for ultimate victory.
	André Masséna	1758–1817	French	General during the French Revolutionary Wars and Marshal of the Empire during the Napoleonic Wars. His memorable performances at the Second Battle of Zurich in 1799, the Battle of Caldiero in 1805, and various other actions throughout his career have earned him a spot among the top dignitaries in the French military pantheon.
	Thomas-Alexandre Dumas	1763–1806	French	Thomas-Alexandre Dumas was the highest-ranked person of color of all time in a European army. General-in-Chief of the French Army of the Alps he get the nicknames "the Horatius Cocles of the Tyrol" by Napoleon and the "Schwarzer Teufel" (Black Devil) by Austrian troops during the Second Italian Campaign. His son, Alexandre Dumas, is one of France's most widely read authors of all time.
	Jean-Baptiste Bernadotte	1763–1844	French	General and then Marshal of the Empire under Napoleon, Bernadotte mainly distinguished himself at Theiningen, where he successfully secured a French retreat. Later, Bernadotte was crowned King of Sweden as Charles XIV and King of Norway as Charles III.
	Jean Victor Marie Moreau	1763–1813	French	French general who served in the French Revolutionary Wars. Moreau's decisive victory at Hohenlinden in 1801 proved pivotal in ending the War of the Second Coalition.
	Joachim Murat	1767–1815	French	Marshal of the Empire and Napoleon's brother-in-law. Murat was a daring and charismatic cavalry officer who took part in many Revolutionary and Napoleonic battles such as the Abukir, Jena, and many others.
	Michel Ney	1769–1815	French	Marshal of the Empire during the Napoleonic Wars, famous for his great courage ("le brave des braves"). Won the Battle of Elchingen and distinguished himself in the Battle of Friedland. He led the rearguard during the retreat from Moscow, securing the withdrawal from constant Russian attacks.
	Jean-de-Dieu Soult	1769–1851	French	Marshal of the Empire during the Napoleonic Wars. Soult played a great part in many of the famous battles of the Grande Armée, including the Battle of Austerlitz in 1805 and the Battle of Jena in 1806. In 1809, he conquered Portugal after his victory at the First Battle of Porto. Finally pushed out of Iberia by the Duke of Wellington he still managed to stop the progression of the combined British, Spanish and Portuguese troops at the Battle of Toulouse.
	Jean Lannes	1769–1809	French	Marshal of the Empire during the Napoleonic Wars. A close friend of Napoleon himself, Lannes distinguished himself at the battles of Montebello and Friedland among many others before being killed on the battlefield at Essling. Napoleon later said of him: "I found him a pygmy and left him a giant."
	Napoleon Bonaparte	1769–1821	French	Napoleon is often ranked among the greatest military commanders of all time. His campaigns established a new era in military history and are still studied at military academies all over the world. His victories at Rivoli, Austerlitz, Friedland, and Dresden still enthrall the popular imagination.
	Louis-Nicolas Davout	1770–1823	French	Widely regarded as Napoleon's greatest marshal, Davout had a tenacious reputation for pulling off surprising victories and never lost a battle. In 1806, 27,000 men of his III Corps defeated 63,000 Prussians at the Battle of Auerstedt, inflicting 13,000 casualties and capturing 115 enemy guns.
	Jean Lafitte	c. 1780–c. 1823	French	French pirate and privateer, Lafitte and his comrades helped General Andrew Jackson at the Battle of New Orleans that turned the tide of the War of 1812.
	Marcellin Marbot	1782–1854	French	He served with great distinction in the Peninsular War under Marshals Lannes and Masséna, and showed himself to be a dashing leader of light cavalry in the Russian and German campaigns. Famous for the fascinating Memoirs of his Life and Campaigns, which give a picture of the Napoleonic age of warfare, that for vividness and romantic interest has never been surpassed.
	Élie Frédéric Forey	1804–1872	French	Division commander during the Crimean and Franco-Austrian wars, Forey saw action at Sevastopol, Montebello and Solferino. Named commanding general of the French expeditionary corps to Mexico in 1862, Forey captured Puebla and Mexico City before to leave after having established a triumvirate to govern Mexico and left his place to Bazaine.
	Patrice MacMahon	1808–1893	French	A brave and skilled general, distinguished himself in Algeria, the Crimean and Italy. He fought well during the Franco-Prussian War, but was wounded and his army was forced to surrender at Sedan. During the aftermath of the war he suppressed the Paris Commune.
	Bazaine	1811–1888	French	The great military hero of the Second Empire who proved himself in the Crimean War and at Solferino (1859) before conducting a horrible campaign during the Franco-Prussian War of 1870–1871.
	Jean Danjou	1828–1863	French	Captain in the French Foreign Legion, he distinguished himself at the head of 64 men against 3,000 Mexicans at Camarón, where the myth of the French Foreign Legion was born.
	Jules Brunet	1838–1911	French	Veteran of the French intervention in Mexico, Brunet distinguished himself in Japan where he was sent as member of a group of military advisors. Brunet received two medals from Japan for his actions during the Boshin War. It appears that he inspired the character of Captain Nathan Algren in the 2003 movie The Last Samurai.
	Oscar de Négrier	1839–1913	French	One of the most charismatic French generals of the Third Republic. De Négrier won notable victories during the Sino-French War such as Kep, Núi Bop and Đồng Đăng. The Battle of Bang Bo was the only defeat he suffered in his entire military career.
	Ferdinand Foch	1851–1929	French	Foch was made the Supreme Allied Commander in 1918 during World War I and engineered the very successful counter-attack at the Second Battle of the Marne, a triumph that set off a series of Allied victories.
	Joseph Joffre	1852–1931	French	Famous French commander of World War I who regrouped the retreating Allied forces to defeat the Germans at the strategically decisive First Battle of the Marne in 1914.
	Philippe Pétain	1856–1951	French	Another great French commander of World War I, Pétain led the French to victory at Verdun and restored the army's morale after the mutinies of 1917. In World War II, he at first fought against and later collaborated with the Germans by leading the government of Vichy France.
	Louis Franchet d'Espèrey	1856–1942	French	Known as ‘Desperate Frankie’ by the British, d'Espèrey led the famous Vardar Offensive of 1918 that captured much of the Balkans and knocked Bulgaria out of the war.
	Jean de Lattre de Tassigny	1889–1952	French	Brilliant French commander during World War II. As part of Operation Dragoon in 1944, his French Army B captured over 28,000 Germans and liberated Marseille and Toulon. He also conducted several brilliant campaigns in the First Indochina War, winning impressively at the Battle of Vĩnh Yên in 1951.
	Charles de Gaulle	1890–1970	French	His theories about armored warfare were ignored by the French military establishment. Mostly noted for his stalwart leadership of the Free French Forces during World War II.
	Jean Moulin	1899–1943	French	The symbol of the French resistance. Not a conventional military leader, in 1942 he was parachuted from England into France to organize and orchestrate the resistance. Captured by the Gestapo, he endured five days of torture at the hands of Klaus Barbie, costing him his life.
	Philippe Leclerc de Hauteclocque	1902–1947	French	Perhaps the greatest French military leader in the Second World War, Leclerc's desert campaigns and his drive on Paris in 1944 are still immortalized in French history.
