= Spartacus: Blood and Sand =

First season of television series

- Season 1
- Starring: Andy Whitfield; John Hannah; Manu Bennett; Erin Cummings; Lucy Lawless; Peter Mensah; Nick E. Tarabay; Jai Courtney; Viva Bianca; Katrina Law
- No. of episodes: 13

Release
- Original network: Starz
- Original release: January 22 – April 16, 2010

Season chronology
- Next → Gods of the Arena

Spartacus: Blood and Sand is the first season of American television series Spartacus, which premiered on Starz on January 22, 2010. The series was inspired by the historical figure of Spartacus (played by Andy Whitfield), a Thracian gladiator who from 73 to 71 BC led a major slave uprising against the Roman Republic. Executive producers Steven S. DeKnight, Robert Tapert and Sam Raimi focused on structuring the events of Spartacus' obscure early life leading up to the beginning of historical records.

== Cast and characters ==
=== Slaves ===
- Andy Whitfield as Spartacus – a Thracian warrior who is condemned to slavery as a gladiator. After the death of Spartacus' wife, Sura, he becomes Mira's lover.
- Manu Bennett as Crixus – a Gaul who is Batiatus' top gladiator prior to Spartacus's arrival. He is Naevia's lover and Lucretia's unwilling lover.
- Peter Mensah as Oenomaus/Doctore – an African slave who serves as trainer of Batiatus' gladiators.
- Nick E. Tarabay as Ashur – a former gladiator from Syria whose leg was crippled in the arena by Crixus. He now serves Batiatus as a bookkeeper and henchman.
- Jai Courtney as Varro – a Roman citizen who sold himself to the ludus to support his family, and who soon becomes Spartacus' confidant and friend in the ludus.
- Antonio Te Maioha as Barca – nicknamed the "Beast of Carthage", he is one of Batiatus' most successful gladiators and serves as a bodyguard for his dominus.
- Eka Darville as Pietros – Barca's younger gay lover and partner.
- Lesley-Ann Brandt as Naevia – Lucretia's loyal body slave. She is Crixus' lover.
- Erin Cummings as Sura – Spartacus' wife.
- Katrina Law as Mira – a slave girl sent, under threat of death, to seduce Spartacus and become his lover. Ultimately she falls in love with him.
- Dan Feuerriegel as Agron – a new German gladiator recruit who helps Spartacus plot his uprising. He is also Duro's older brother.
- Andre Cunningham as Duro- a new German gladiator recruit and Agron's younger brother.

=== Romans ===
- John Hannah as Quintus Lentulus Batiatus – a lanista and Spartacus' dominus.
- Lucy Lawless as Lucretia – Batiatus' wife and Crixus' lover.
- Viva Bianca as Ilithyia – the daughter of Roman senator Albinius and wife of legatus Gaius Claudius Glaber.
- Craig Parker as Gaius Claudius Glaber – a legatus in the Roman Army who is responsible for Spartacus' enslavement.
- Craig Walsh Wrightson as Solonius – a former close friend, but now the greatest rival to the House of Batiatus.
- Brooke Williams as Aurelia – Varro's wife.

== Style ==
The program is preceded by a warning that it purports to portray a "historical portrayal of ancient Roman society that contains graphic violence and adult content". Incidental nudity and scenes of a sexual or of a violent nature are present throughout.

== Episodes ==
No. overall	No. in season	Title	Directed by	Written by	Original release date	Prod. code	US viewers (millions)
1	1	"The Red Serpent"	Rick Jacobson	Steven S. DeKnight	January 22, 2010	SPS101	0.66
In the series premiere, in 73 B.C., a nameless Thracian warrior and his fellow fighters align themselves with legate Gaius Claudius Glaber and Rome to protect their homeland. But disenchantment with the Romans soon sets in when their allies' strategies leave their homeland unprotected from Getae marauders. The warrior leads a rebellion of the auxiliary troops against the Roman officers, then deserts to return to his village and his wife. He arrives as the Getae attack and reunites with his wife, who tells him that she had a vision of him "falling before a red serpent." He and his wife manage to escape, only to be captured by Glaber the next day. The warrior's wife, Sura, is forced into slavery and he and the other deserters are shipped to the arena in Capua, to be put to death publicly by gladiators. However, he proves his worth by defeating all four opponents, and is given a new name, Spartacus.
2	2	"Sacramentum Gladiatorum"	Rick Jacobson	Steven S. DeKnight	January 29, 2010	SPS102	0.77
The newly enslaved Thracian warrior Spartacus enters the ludus of Lentulus Batiatus to receive gladiator training and discipline. He soon manages to make an enemy of the undefeated Gallic champion of Capua, Crixus, and the attention of whip-wielding taskmaster Doctore who uses harsh methods to test the new novices. He also meets Varro, a Roman gladiator by bankruptcy, who becomes his friend. The crafty but cash-strapped Batiatus fails to impress Glaber and so makes Spartacus, his new slave, an offer: if he cooperates and trains as a prized gladiator, he will use his power to help locate his wife. Consequently Spartacus trains to face the test to be a gladiator, and throws Crixus from the platform and wins. Afterwards, the victorious Spartacus swears the sacramentum of the gladiator brotherhood.
3	3	"Legends"	Grady Hall	Brent Fletcher	February 5, 2010	SPS103	0.86
As the gladiators prepare for the series of fights that will be the highlight of the upcoming Vulcanalia festival, Spartacus cleverly manoeuvres to secure the right to battle Crixus, the unbeaten champion of Capua, in the primus or final battle. Despite his wife Lucretia's objections, Batiatus reminds her that Spartacus' bravery and previous exploits have "struck a chord with the public's interest". Meanwhile, Lucretia schemes to win favor with the wife of Gaius Claudius Glaber, the crafty and devious Ilithyia. At a pre-fight banquet, she interests her in the desirous Crixus, although he is secretly enamoured of Naevia, one of the domestic slaves. At the Vulcanalia, Spartacus embarrasses his owners publicly, both by beginning to fight too early, and by surrendering instead of dying.
4	4	"The Thing in the Pit"	Jesse Warn	Aaron Helbing & Todd Helbing	February 12, 2010	SPS104	0.66
Spartacus' disgrace at surrendering to Crixus in the arena leads Batiatus to punish him by demoting the Thracian to fight in the "pits of the underworld," a hellish, vicious subterranean battle arena where the crowds are frenzied and anything goes. When Naevia seemingly rejects Crixus' necklace gift, he initially misunderstands the reason for her refusal, and continues his secretive sexual relationship with Batiatus' wife. Meanwhile, the drought and Batiatus' money problems continue, and Lucretia ends up selling her new emerald necklace at a loss in the markets. Spartacus somehow survives the pits, and despite losing Batiatus' winnings, he regains the favour of his dominus after helping to foil an assassination attempt by two slaves, and is restored again to gladiator status.
5	5	"Shadow Games"	Michael Hurst	Miranda Kwok	February 19, 2010	SPS105	0.85
As the summer heat continues, enemies Spartacus and Crixus are commanded to take on an unbeaten champion named Theokoles, the "shadow of death". Doctore, being the only warrior to have fought Theokoles and lived, is charged with preparing the two men for the drought-breaking primus, but receives little satisfaction from either man. Spartacus tries to find common ground with his arch-enemy but Crixus remains stalwartly opposed to sharing any of the glory. Meanwhile, after the visit of a fertility priestess, Lucretia is denied a chance to conceive as Crixus, distracted by Naevia, declines her advances. Meanwhile, the wounded Batiatus continues his own investigations into the attempt on his life, and exacts blood vengeance on Ovidius, the cousin of Magistrate Calavius, and his family. In the arena, Theokoles is finally bested by Spartacus and the drought breaks once Theokoles dies, earning Spartacus the titles of "Slayer of Theokoles" and "Bringer of Rain". However, Crixus is critically wounded in the encounter and is taken away to recover.
6	6	"Delicate Things"	Rick Jacobson	Tracy Bellomo & Andrew Chambliss	February 26, 2010	SPS106	1.08
As the rains fall, both Barca and Spartacus envision a future away from the ludus. Barca expects to purchase his and Pietros' freedom, while Spartacus dreams of escaping with his enslaved wife, Sura. Crixus, barely alive after the near-fatal fight with Theokoles, is now in a drugged sleep. As part of his promotion to new Capuan champion, Spartacus tries on new armour, and during a private lesson with the Magistrate's son, Numerius, he steals a dagger for the escape. Spartacus also uses some of his winnings to buy wine and women for the gladiators, to further aid the escape plan. Meanwhile, Batiatus is troubled by false news that Ovidius' son still lives, and Ashur uses the chance to have Barca killed to avoid repaying the winnings owed to him. In the end Batiatus keeps his word of retrieving Sura, but her reunion with Spartacus is short lived as she quickly dies from wounds sustained in a "bandit attack".
7	7	"Great and Unfortunate Things"	Jesse Warn	Brent Fletcher & Steven S. DeKnight	March 12, 2010	SPS107	0.97
Spartacus' world is changed by the death of his wife and he finds himself at a crossroads. In the absence of Barca, Pietros struggles without a protector and is unable to deal with the brutal attentions of Gnaeus. Meanwhile, Varro is visited by his wife and son and receives unwelcome news that she too, without her protector, has also been raped. Amidst the deceit of the household, Doctore seeks the truth behind Barca's sudden departure from the ludus. Pietros, now without hope, hangs himself – and Spartacus avenges him by throwing Gnaeus off the cliff to his death. Spartacus, again at odds with Batiatus, is forced to repay Gnaeus' death from his winnings. After returning the stolen dagger, he decides to focus on his new gladiatorial life. In the arena, while dressed as a Roman consul, he fights six criminals dressed as Thracians, and trusting himself to his wife's gods, he begins to purge his past. He kills the criminals, and to the cheering crowd victoriously proclaims "I am Spartacus!".
8	8	"Mark of the Brotherhood"	Rowan Woods	Aaron Helbing & Todd Helbing	March 19, 2010	SPS108	0.88
Spartacus continues his reign as the Champion of Capua at rival Solonius' expense, while Crixus struggles to recover and return to training. After comments made by Ashur, Batiatus begins to explore the possibility of selling the Gaul to a rival ludus in Damascus. Meanwhile, Batiatus acquires six new recruits for 100 denarii, and Ilithyia chooses to sponsor one, a Gaul named Segovax, in order to both defy her husband and impress her socialite friends. After a slight to her husband's honour by Spartacus at a private party, she implies to the recruit that she will set him free in exchange for his help. Crixus, after working to regain Lucretia's sexual favour, interrupts Segovax's attempt to strangle Spartacus. Crixus and Spartacus, both wounded in the fight, begin to renew a sense of brotherhood with each other. Ilithyia, on a return visit, arrives in time to both witness her sponsored slave's crucifixion and deny any knowledge of the reasons behind the attack.
9	9	"Whore"	Michael Hurst	Daniel Knauf	March 26, 2010	SPS109	1.11
Licinia, a rich noblewoman and cousin of senator Marcus Crassus, visits from Rome and asks Lucretia to "taste the wares of ludus" with Spartacus. Lucretia, mindful that Spartacus had not been with a woman since his capture, instructs a female slave named Mira to prepare him for his encounter, but Spartacus rejects her. Ilithyia, suspecting her rich friend's desires, also decides on a masked sexual encounter. Jealously enraged by her choice of Crixus (who has recently resumed training), Lucretia sets up to have Ilithyia discovered in bed by Licinia. Shocked after it is revealed that both intended to use the scandal against her, Ilythia suddenly kills Licinia. Meanwhile, elsewhere in the ludus, Batiatus' plan to kill Solonius is undermined by a slighted Ashur, Crixus makes enemies of two new German brothers Agron and Duro, Varro's wife and son have gone missing, and Naevia steals a guard's key for an illicit tryst.
10	10	"Party Favors"	Chris Martin-Jones	Brent Fletcher & Miranda Kwok	April 2, 2010	SPS110	1.27
Spartacus and Crixus are set up to fight in an exhibition match for Numerius' coming of age party, and Crixus sees a chance to resume his position. Batiatus, realising Spartacus' importance to his ambitions, invites him to play a board game called Latrunculi, but Lucretia jealously disapproves of the two men sharing wine. Meanwhile, Naevia has troubles with the guard she stole the key from, and risks all to share time with Crixus. At the party a now revived Ilithyia, still haunted by memories of the murder, seduces Numerius and has him switch Spartacus's opponent to Varro and demand his death at the end of what was supposed to be an exhibition match, forcing Spartacus to reluctantly kill his only friend. Later that night, after Batiatus' interest in politics is dismissed by Calavius, he vows blood revenge for his fighter's death. Distraught with grief, Spartacus returns to his cell and vents his rage until Mira comes in to comfort him.
11	11	"Old Wounds"	Glenn Standring	Story by : Dan Filie & Patricia Wells	April 9, 2010	SPS111	1.13
Spartacus is continually haunted by the death of his friend and admits to Varro's wife, Aurelia, that he died by his sword. At the same time, Batiatus fakes another bandit raid and kidnaps Magistrate Calavius, holding him captive in the city sewers. Meanwhile, a festering wound from the fight with Varro weakens Spartacus, and while he recuperates with the help of the medicus and Mira, more visions of the dead haunt his feverish dreams. In the arena, Crixus reclaims some of his lost glory when he is needed in the primus against Pompeius' unbeaten champion, Pericles – a fight he narrowly wins. Later, in the infirmary, Spartacus throttles Aulus, Sura's killer (having noticed he had no actual wound as suffered in her attack), and learns that Batiatus ordered her death. Batiatus' scheming comes to fruition as he, with the cunning help of Ashur, is able to successfully entrap Solonius for Calavius' murder.
12	12	"Revelations"	Michael Hurst	Brent Fletcher	April 16, 2010	SPS112	1.29
In the arena, Crixus continues his winning streak, and Spartacus kills the condemned Solonius. Spartacus also plots vengeance, but is warned by Mira that any attack on the master risks the life of all slaves. When finally granted an audience with Batiatus, he stays his hand when he notices Varro's widow, Aurelia, now working as a debt-slave. The ludus later awaits the arrival of Ilithyia and her husband Claudius Glaber, and Batiatus ends up being irked by Glaber's bluntness, but also surprised by his wife's pregnancy. Meanwhile, Spartacus fights against Glaber's soldiers, and Ashur's vengeful scheming finally exposes the relationship between Crixus and Naevia, leading to a scene. When Glaber refuses to sponsor Batiatus, he and Lucretia desperately reveal Ilithyia's hand in Licinia's murder and Glaber is forced to acquiesce. In the end, Crixus is flogged while Naevia is sold – but before leaving, she tells Doctore the truth behind Barca's "freedom". Returning to his cell, Spartacus tells Agron and Duro that to escape from the Romans, they will "kill them all".
13	13	"Kill Them All"	Jesse Warn	Steven S. DeKnight	April 23, 2010	SPS113	1.23
In front of the Capuan elite assembled on the balcony of the ludus, Crixus and Spartacus fight to the death, a bout arranged by Batiatus for their sport. However, two days earlier, Spartacus endeavors to enlist the help of the rest of the gladiators to lead a revolt to destroy the house of Batiatus once and for all. Spartacus gains support from Mira, who is tasked with opening the gate, but Crixus resists in hopes of reuniting with Naevia. Steadfast in their respective causes, Spartacus and Crixus coming to a mutual understanding. Meanwhile, Doctore (whose real name is revealed to be Oenomaus) confronts Batiatus about Barca's death and Ashur's hand in it. Later, during the duel, after learning he was given poison to ensure Spartacus' victory, Crixus finally joins the revolt. In the melee, Doctore initially stops Spartacus from killing Batiatus, but Crixus persuades him to join them just as Ilithyia escapes by having her husband's soldiers seal the villa doors. Duro is killed after saving Agron, Ashur escapes the carnage, and Crixus stabs Lucretia, killing their unborn child. Aurelia stabs Numerius to death in revenge for Varro, and Spartacus confronts and kills Batiatus. After the massacre, he vows to the surviving gladiators and house slaves that they will make Rome "tremble". Spartacus leads the gladiators and house slaves from the ludus.

- The season premiere was simulcast on both Starz and Encore. On Encore, the premiere garnered 580,000 viewers.

== Production ==
On December 22, 2009, the show was renewed for a second season but its production was postponed after Andy Whitfield was diagnosed with early-stage non-Hodgkin lymphoma. Starz announced in May 2010 that it would develop a six-episode prequel series, entitled Spartacus: Gods of the Arena, to allow star actor Whitfield to undergo medical treatment. The prequel featured both new and returning characters; it was headlined by John Hannah (as Batiatus) and Lucy Lawless (as Lucretia). Whitfield also provided a brief voice-over role. Filming began in New Zealand in the Summer of 2009. The prequel aired beginning January 2011.

In June 2010, season two's pre-production resumed after Starz announced Whitfield was cancer-free. But when his cancer recurred, Starz replaced Whitfield (with the actor's consent) with Liam McIntyre as Spartacus for season two which is titled Spartacus: Vengeance. Andy Whitfield died on September 11, 2011.

== International broadcast ==
Three days after the US premiere, the series began airing in Canada on TMN beginning on January 25, 2010. RTL 5 announced in their January newsletter that Spartacus: Blood and Sand would debut in the Netherlands in March 2010. In the United Kingdom, Bravo began airing the series on May 25, 2010. Following the axe of the Bravo network on UK television, Sky1 picked up the rights to the series with plans to carry all subsequent seasons. The series was also scheduled to premiere in Poland on HBO Poland starting from June 19, 2010 and in Hungary on HBO Magyarország starting from June 1, 2010. The series aired in Ireland on TV3. In Brazil, the show aired on Globosat HD. In Turkey the show releases on CNBC-E TV, while in Italy Sky Television gained the rights of the series. In India and Pakistan, the show aired (as of June 2011) on HBO. In Slovenia, the series started airing on Kanal A on January 2, 2012, from Monday to Friday at 9.45 pm, and ended January 18, 2012.

== Reception ==
The premiere episode of the series set a record for Starz, with 553,000 viewers on their network, and another 460,000 on Encore, where the show was available only that weekend. For the rest of the season the show had an average of 1.285 million viewers. Critical reception of the first episode was mixed; the review aggregate website Metacritic which assigns a normalized average score out of 100 gave the show a score of 54% based on 22 reviews. Ken Tucker of Entertainment Weekly gave it the grade B+, saying it "might prove to be the not-at-all-guilty pleasure of the season." Barry Garron of The Hollywood Reporter suggested that with "such thin stories... it's small wonder that sex and violence are used to take up the slack." Robert Lloyd of the Los Angeles Times wrote that John Hannah as Batiatus "keeps the show grounded with a persuasive portrait of a man engaged in a stressful daily business" and called Whitfield as Spartacus "handsome and buff and smart and beastly." Mark Perigard of the Boston Herald gave the season finale a positive review, rating it a B+. He commented on the improvement of the series throughout its first season.

== Other media ==
=== Novels ===
In 2012 Titan Books announced the publication of a series of novels based on Spartacus: Blood and Sand. The first, titled Spartacus: Swords & Ashes, was written by J.M. Clements and released on January 3, 2012. The second book in the series was Spartacus: Morituri by Mark Morris.

=== Board game ===
In 2012 Gale Force Nine announced the creation of a licensed board game based on the series. The English language release, Spartacus: A Game of Blood and Treachery, had a limited release at Gen Con 2012 and a general release to game and hobby stores on September 28, 2012. Gameplay involves players taking on the role of Dominus, or head of a Roman house in ancient Rome, buying and trading assets, scheming with and against the other players, and battling in the arena. In May 2013 an expansion entitled Spartacus: The Serpents and the Wolf was released. The expansion allows for two extra players (to an updated maximum of six) with the addition of two more houses and includes alternative rules allowing for group battles in the arena.

=== Comics ===
Earlier, in 2009, Devil's Due had published a four-part prequel comic series titled Spartacus - Blood and Sand. Each issue spotlighted a character from the planned television series, mostly the minor gladiator rivals of the main cast.

The series was adapted as a 4-part motion comic adaptation called Spartacus – Blood and Sand – Motion Comic. Ray Park and Heath Freeman were cast. Kyle Newman was the director, and the producers were Andy Collen and Jeff Krelitz.

#	Title	Spotlights	Writer	Artist	Run Time (Motion Comic)
1	Upon the Sands of Vengeance	Arkadios, the Red Serpent	Steven S. DeKnight	Adam Archer	16 minutes
2	Shadows of the Jackal	The Gargan Twins	Jimmy Palmiotti	Dexter Soy	16 minutes
3	The Beast of Carthage	Barca, the Beast of Carthage	Todd & Aaron Helbing	Jon Bosco & Guilherme Balbi	9 minutes
4	The Shadow of Death	Theokoles, the Shadow of Death	Miranda Kwok	Allan Jefferson	12 minutes
