= Battle of Mount Vesuvius =

73 BCE conflict of the Third Servile War, battle

- Part of the Third Servile War
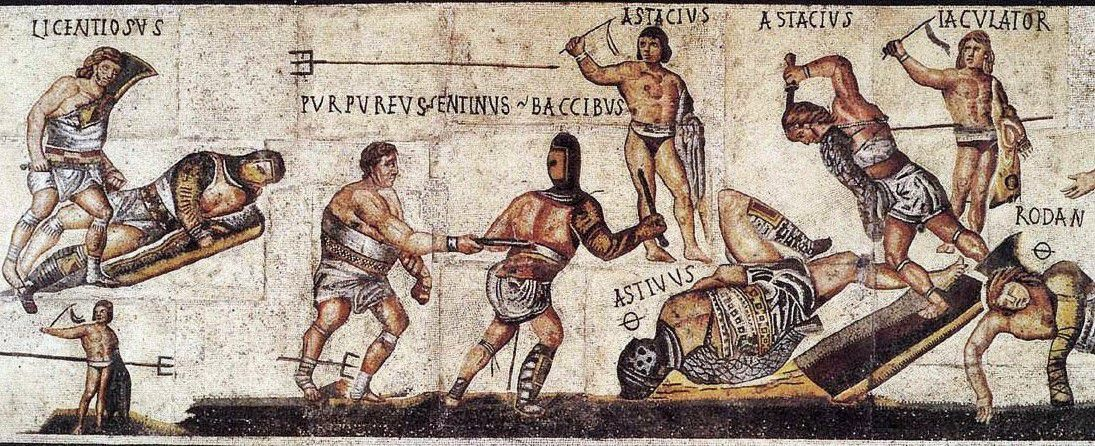
- The Gladiator Mosaic at the Galleria Borghese
Date	73 BC
Location	Mount Vesuvius, Italy
Result	Rebel victory; Start of the Third Servile War.

Belligerents
Roman Republic	Rebels

Commanders and leaders
Gaius Claudius Glaber †	Spartacus

Strength
3,000 militia	70–100 Gladiators

The Battle of Vesuvius was the first conflict of the Third Servile War which pitted the escaped slaves against a military force of militia specifically dispatched by Rome to deal with the rebellion.

When the militia, led by the Roman Praetor Gaius Claudius Glaber, besieged the group of escaped slaves on Mount Vesuvius, Spartacus's men adopted unusual tactics, rappelling down the steeper cliff face opposite the Roman forces, flanking and defeating them.

== Background ==
=== Capuan revolt ===
In the Roman Republic of the 1st century, gladiatorial games were one of the more popular forms of entertainment. In order to supply gladiators for the contests, several training schools, or ludi, were established throughout Italy. In these schools, prisoners of war and condemned criminals—who were considered slaves—were taught the skills required to fight to the death in gladiatorial games. In 73 BC, a group of some 200 gladiators in the Capuan school owned by Lentulus Batiatus plotted an escape. When their plot was betrayed, a force of about 70 men seized kitchen implements, ("choppers and spits"), fought their way free from the school, and seized several wagons of gladiatorial weapons and armor.

Once free, the escaped gladiators chose leaders from their number, selecting two Gallic slaves—Crixus and Oenomaus—and Spartacus, who was said either to be a Thracian auxiliary from the Roman legions later condemned to slavery, or a captive taken by the legions. There is some question as to Spartacus's nationality, however, as a Thraex (plural Thraces or Threses) was a type of gladiator in Rome, the title "Thracian" may simply refer to the style of gladiatorial combat in which he was trained.

These escaped slaves were able to defeat a small force of troops sent after them from Capua, and equip themselves with captured military equipment as well as their gladiatorial weapons. Sources are somewhat contradictory on the order of events immediately following the escape, but they generally agree that this band of escaped gladiators plundered the region surrounding Capua, recruited many other slaves into their ranks, and eventually retired to a more defensible position on Mount Vesuvius.

== Battle ==
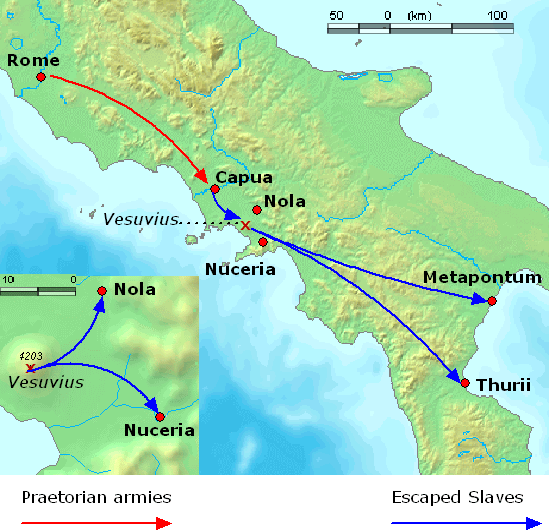
The initial movements of Roman and Slave forces from the Capuan revolt up to and including the winter of 73–72 BC.

As the revolt and raids were occurring in Campania—which was a vacation region of the rich and influential in Rome, and the location of many estates—the revolt quickly came to the attention of Roman authorities. They initially viewed the revolt as more a major crime wave than an armed rebellion.

However, later that year, Rome dispatched military force under praetorian authority to put down the rebellion. A Roman praetor, Gaius Claudius Glaber, gathered a force of 3,000 men, not as legions, but as a militia "picked up in haste and at random, for the Romans did not consider this a war yet, but a raid, something like an attack of robbery." Glaber's forces besieged the slaves on Mount Vesuvius, blocking the only known way down the mountain. With the slaves thus contained, Glaber was content to wait until starvation forced the slaves to surrender.

While the slaves lacked military training, Spartacus' forces displayed ingenuity in their use of available local materials, and in their use of clever, unorthodox tactics when facing the disciplined Roman armies. In response to Glaber's siege, Spartacus' men made ropes and ladders from vines and trees growing on the slopes of Vesuvius and used them to rappel down the cliffs on the side of the mountain opposite Glaber's forces. They moved around the base of Vesuvius, outflanked the army, and annihilated Glaber's men.

== Aftermath ==
A second expedition, under the praetor Publius Varinius, was then dispatched against Spartacus. For some reason, Varinius seems to have split his forces under the command of his subordinates Furius and Cossinius. Plutarch mentions that Furius commanded some 2,000 men, but neither the strength of the remaining forces, nor whether the expedition was composed of militia or legions, appears to be known. These forces were also defeated by the army of escaped slaves: Cossinius was killed, Varinius was nearly captured, and the equipment of the armies was seized by the slaves.

With these successes, more and more slaves flocked to the Spartacan forces, as did "many of the herdsmen and shepherds of the region", swelling their ranks to some 70,000. The rebel slaves spent the winter of 73–72 BC training, arming and equipping their new recruits, and expanding their raiding territory to include the towns of Nola, Nuceria, Thurii and Metapontum.

The victories of the rebel slaves did not come without a cost. At some time during these events, one of their leaders, Oenomaus, was lost—presumably in battle—and is not mentioned further in the histories.
