= Quintus Marcius Rufus =

Roman legate during Third Servile War

Quintus Marcius Rufus was a Roman legate under Marcus Licinius Crassus in 71 BC during the Third Servile War. He is known only by a passage in Frontinus' Strategemata. Based on his name, he was identified by Friedrich Münzer as possibly also being the same Quintus Marcius who is epigraphically attested as having served as plebeian tribune and curator viarum in 71 BC. This identification, however, is not adopted by T R S Broughton's Magistrates of the Roman Republic.

Frontinus says that during the war, when the Romans were to engage Castus and Gannicus, Gallic leaders of the servile armies, Marcius was assigned command of twelve cohorts along with a Gaius Pomptinius. The two men led the force toward the enemy's rear, using a mountain as cover. When the Battle of Cantenna started, Marcius and Pomptinus' cohorts attacked the servile army from its rear, causing it to rout.
