= List of Heroscape supplements =

This is a list of supplemental materials for Heroscape, a miniature-based strategy board game. There are three types of sets: Master sets provide enough terrain, figures, and other materials to be able to play the game. Small expansion sets provide small characters, often in themed waves. Large expansions provide new terrain and terrain-specific characters, or large characters. Additionally, promotional sets were released through specific store conventions.

== Master sets ==
=== Rise of the Valkyrie ===
Released in 2004, Rise of the Valkyrie was the first master set released for the game.

- Figures: Raelin the Kyrie Warrior (1), Sgt. Drake Alexander (1), Airborne Elite (4), Finn the Viking Champion (1), Thorgrim the Viking Champion (1), Tarn Viking Warriors (4), Syvarris (1), Agent Carr (1), Krav Maga Agents (3), Mimring (1), Grimnak (1), Ne-Gok-Sa (1), Marro Warriors (4), Deathwalker 9000 (1), Zettian Guards (2), Izumi Samurai (3)
- Glyphs: Glyph of Astrid, Glyph of Gerda, Glyph of Ivor, Glyph of Valda, Glyph of Dagmar, 2 Glyphs of Brandar, Glyph of Kelda, Glyph of Erland, Glyph of Mitonsoul
- Terrain: 6 twenty-four-hex grass, 5 seven-hex grass, 5 three-hex grass, 5 two-hex grass, 16 one-hex grass, 2 twenty-four-hex rock, 3 seven-hex rock, 3 three-hex rock, 3 two-hex rock, 6 one-hex rock, 2 seven-hex sand, 2 three-hex sand, 2 two-hex sand, 4 one-hex sand, 21 one-hex water
- Other: 1 Round Marker, 1 Grenade Marker, 24 Wound Markers, 1 20 Sided Die, 12 Combat Dice, 16 Order Markers, 1 Rulebook

=== Swarm of the Marro ===
Released in 2007, Swarm of the Marro was the second master set released for the main game.

- Figures: Tor-Kul-Na (1), Sgt. Drake Alexander (1, new), Raelin the Kyrie Warrior (1, new), Shiori (1), Major Q10 (1), Sonlen (1), Marro Stingers (2 sets of 3), Marro Drudge (2 sets of 3), Marrden Nagrubs (2 sets of 3), Marro Hive (1)
- Glyphs: Glyph of Ulaniva, Glyph of Crevcor, Glyph of Wannok, Glyph of Thorian, Glyph of Proftaka, Glyph of Brandar, Glyph of Nilrend, Glyph of Oreld
- Terrain: 1 seven-hex rock, 1 three-hex rock, 1 two-hex rock, 1 one-hex rock, 5 seven-hex sand, 2 three-hex sand, 1 one-hex sand, 34 one-hex swamp water, 8 one-hex water, 2 twenty-four-hex swamp, 10 seven-hex swamp, 2 three-hex swamp 3, 2 two-hex swamp, 2 one-hex swamp, 1 two-hex grass, 1 one-hex grass
- Other: 1 Round Marker, 23 Wound Markers, 1 Negation Marker, 1 20 Sided Die, 12 Combat Dice, 16 Order Markers, 1 Rulebook

=== Themed sets ===
Marvel: The Conflict Begins (July 2007): Marvel Master Set 1

- Figures (10): Captain America, Red Skull, Spider-Man, Venom, Iron Man, Doctor Doom, Hulk, Abomination, Silver Surfer, Thanos
- Glyphs:
- Terrain:
- Other:

Battle for the Underdark (2010): "Dungeonscape" Master Set I

An alternate storyline/universe for Heroscape that featured figures from Dungeon-and-Dragons alongside traditional Heroscape figures when the game was taken over by Wizards of the Coast.

- Figures: Tandros Kreel (1), Erevan Sunshadow (1), Ana Karithon (1), Darrak Ambershard (1), Pelloth (1), Deepwyrm Drow (3), Othkurik the Black Dragon (1), Feral Troll (1)
- Glyphs:
- Terrain:
- Other:

=== Age of Annihilation ===
After a failed revival attempt in 2022 by Avalon Hill, Renegade Game Studios (a Hasbro licensee) announced that they were manufacturing Wave 1 of the Heroscape revival, which would include the master set Age of Annihilation in August 2024. As a first, the Age of Annihilation master set could be purchased with either unpainted or pre-painted figures.

- Figures: Raelin the Kyrie Warrior (1, new), Loviatäk the Kyrie Warrior (1), Misaerx the Kyrie Warrior (1), Raakchott Steward of Death (1), Knight Irene (1), Dorim the Bulkhead Brawler (1), Frostclaw Paladins (4), Knaves of the Silver Scimitar (4), Exiles of the Sundered Sea (4), Xenithrax the Vineweaver (1), Admiral EJ-1M (1)
- Glyphs: Glyph of Brandar, Glyph of Dagmar, Glyph of Rannveig, 3 Xenithrax Vine Glyphs, Glyph of Yadulkia, Glyph of Felaron, Glyph of Haukeland, Glyph of Mitonsoul, Glyph of Quillivon
- Terrain: Grass, Sand, Rock, Sparkly Water
- Other: Laur Walls

== Expansion sets ==
=== Small expansion sets ===
Malliddon's Prophecy (January 2005): Wave 1

- Grut Orcs: 2 common squads (4 Blade Grut Orcs, 3 Arrow Grut Orcs), terrain, 1 glyph, 2 army cards, and 1 glyph card.
- The IX Roman Legion: 2 common squads (4 Roman Legionnaires, 3 Roman Archers), terrain, 1 glyph, 2 army cards, and 1 glyph card.
- Snipers and Vipers: 2 common squads (3 Venoc Vipers, 3 Omnicron Snipers), terrain, 1 glyph, 2 army cards, and 1 glyph card.
- Heroes of Bleakwood: 5 unique heroes (Taelord the Kyrie Warrior, Tornak, Venoc Warlord, Kelda the Kyrie Warrior, Marcus Decimus Gallus), terrain, 1 glyph, 5 army cards, and 1 glyph card.

Utgar's Rage (May 2005): Wave 2

- Drones and Minions: 2 common squads (3 Marro Drones, 3 Minions of Utgar), 2 two-hex tiles, and 2 army cards.
- Minutemen and Wolves: 2 common squads (4 4th Massachusetts Line, 3 Anubian Wolves), 2 two-hex tiles, and 2 army cards.
- Knights and The Swog Rider: 1 common squad (4 Knights of Weston), 1 common hero (Swog Rider), 2 two-hex tiles, and 2 army cards.
- Heroes of Barrenspur: 4 unique heroes (Khosumet the Darklord, Me-Burq-Sa, Krug, Sir Denrick), 2 two-hex tiles, and 4 army cards.

Jandar's Oath (September 2005): Wave 3

- Kilts and Commandos: 2 common squads (3 Microcorp Agents, 4 MacDirk Warriors), 2 two-hex sand tiles, and 2 army cards.
- Monks and Sentinels: 2 common squads (3 Shaolin Monks, 3 Sentinels of Jandar), 2 two-hex sand tiles, and 2 army cards.
- Gorillas and Hounds: 2 common squads (3 Marrden Hounds, 3 Gorillinators), 2 two-hex sand tiles, and 2 army cards.
- Heroes of Nostralund: 5 unique heroes (Alastair MacDirk, Concan the Kyrie Warrior, Deathwalker 7000, Johnny 'Shotgun' Sullivan, Saylind the Kyrie Warrior), 2 two-hex sand tiles, and 5 army cards.

Zanafor's Discovery (2006): Wave 4

- Greeks and Vipers: 2 common squads (4 Sacred Band, 3 Armoc Vipers), terrain, and 2 army cards.
- Lawmen and Samurai: 1 unique squad (3 Tagawa Samurai), 3 unique heroes (Deadeye Dan, Guilty McCreech, James Murphy), terrain, 3 experience markers, and 4 army cards.
- Soulborgs and Elves: 2 common squads (4 Gladiatrons, 3 Aubrien Archers), terrain, and 2 army cards.
- Heroes of Trollsford: 5 unique heroes (Sudema, Valguard, Morsbane, Parmenio, Major X17), terrain, 3 ability markers, and 5 army cards.

Thora's Vengeance (2006): Wave 5

- Ninjas and Samurai: 2 unique squads (3 Ninjas of the Northern Wind, 3 Kozuke Samurai), snow terrain, and 2 army cards.
- Warriors and Soulborgs: 2 common squads (3 Warriors of Ashra, 4 Deathreavers), snow terrain, and 2 army cards.
- Soulborgs: 2 common squads (3 Deathstalkers, 4 Blastatrons), snow terrain, and 2 army cards.
- Gladiators and Agents: 1 unique squad (3 Nakita Agents), 3 unique heroes (Spartacus, Crixus, Retiarius), snow terrain, and 4 army cards.

Dawn of Darkness (March 2007): Wave 6

- Archers and Kyrie: 2 common squads (3 Tagawa Samurai Archers, 3 The Einar Imperium) and 2 army cards.
- Shades and Orcs: 2 common squads (4 Heavy Gruts, 3 Shades of Bleakwoode) and 2 army cards.
- Zombie Horde: 2 common squads (3 and 3 Zombies of Morindan) and 2 army cards.
- Heroes of Durgeth: 5 hero figures (Kee-Mo-Shi, Eldgrim the Viking Champion, Empress Kiova, Runa, Kaemon Awa) and 5 army cards.

Fields of Valor (June 2007): Wave 7

- Spearmen and Riflemen: 2 common squads (4 Ashigaru Yari, 4 Ashigaru Harquebus) and 2 army cards.
- Knights Templar: 1 common squad (3 Templar Cavalry) and 1 army card.
- Fiends & Vampires: 2 unique heroes (Iskra Esenwein, and Marcu Esenwein), 1 unique squad (3 Rechets of Bogdan), and 3 army cards.
- Heroes of Elswin: 5 unique heroes (Cyprien Esenwein, Sonya Esenwein, Isamu, Warden 816, Kyntela Gwyn) and 5 army cards.

Defenders of Kinsland (June 2008): Wave 8

- Marro Cavalry: 1 common squad (Grok Riders) and 1 army card.
- Soldiers and Wolves: 2 common squads (4 10th Regiment of Foot, 3 Wolves of Badru) and 2 army cards.
- Elves: 4 unique heroes (Arkmer, Emirroon, Jorhdawn, Ulginesh) and 4 army cards.
- Heroes of the Molten Sea: 5 unique heroes (Chardris, Kato Katsuro, Moriko, Otonashi, Sir Dupuis) and 5 army cards.

Blackmoon's Siege (June 2009): Wave 9

- Dividers and Defenders: 2 common squads (3 Protectors of Ullar, 3 Marro Dividers) and 2 army cards.
- Dwarves and Repulsors: 2 common squads (4 Axegrinders of the Burning Forge, 3 Omnicron Repulsors) and 2 army cards.
- Braves and Brawlers: 2 common squads (3 Mohican River Tribe, 3 Capuan Gladiators) and 2 army cards.
- Heroes of the Moon Tribe: 5 unique heroes (Kumiko, Atlaga, Migol Ironwill, Tul-Bak-Ra, Brave Arrow) and 5 army cards.

Valkrill's Gambit (October/November 2009): Wave 10, Special Collection

- Warriors and Soulborgs: 2 common squads (3 Warriors of Ashra, 4 Deathreavers) and 2 army cards. These were reissued from Wave 5.
- Soulborgs: 2 common squads (3 Deathstalkers, 4 Blastatrons) and 2 army cards. These were reissued from Wave 5.
- Warriors of Feldspar: 2 common squads (3 Granite Guardians, 3 Quasatch Hunters) and 2 army cards. These were repaints of Obsidian Guards and Dzu-Teh respectively.
- Champions of Renown: 2 unique heroes (Sir Hawthorne, Nerak the Glacian Swog Rider), 1 unique squad (Elite Onyx Vipers), and 3 army cards. These were reissued GenCon promotional figures and Walmart Exclusive Edition RotV figures.

=== Small expansion sets (D&D) ===
Champions of the Forgotten Realms (March 2010): Wave D1

- Warriors of the Ghostlight Fen: 1 common squad (3 Phantom Knights), 1 common hero (Sahuagin Raider), 1 uncommon hero (Fen Hydra), 1 temporary Treasure Glyph (Ring of Protection), 3 army cards, and 1 glyph card.
- Fury of the Primordials: 4 common heroes (Water Elemental, Fire Elemental, Air Elemental, and Earth Elemental), 1 uncommon hero (Wyvern), 1 temporary Treasure Glyph (Elixir of Speed), 5 army cards, and 1 glyph card.
- Glaun Bog Raiders: 1 common squad (3 Greenscale Warriors), 1 common hero (Drow Chainfighter), 1 uncommon hero (Greater Ice Elemental), 1 temporary Treasure Glyph (Whetstone of Venom), 3 army cards, and 1 glyph card.
- Heroes of Faerun: 5 unique heroes (Morgrimm Forgehammer, Brandis Skyhunter, Sharwin Wildborn, Torin, and Estivara), 1 permanent Treasure Glyph (Holy Symbol of Pelor), 5 army cards, and 1 glyph card.

Warriors of Eberron (August 2010): Wave D2

- Golem and Wyrmlings: 4 common heroes (White Wyrmling, Red Wyrmling, Black Wyrmling, Blue Wyrmling), 1 uncommon hero (Iron Golem), 1 temporary Treasure Glyph (Bracers of Teleportation), 5 army cards, and 1 glyph card.
- Veterans of the Last War: 1 common squad (3 Warforged Soldiers), 2 uncommon heroes (Werewolf Lord and Mind Flayer Mastermind), 3 Lycanthrope Markers, 1 temporary Treasure Glyph (Cloak of Invisibility), 3 army cards, and 1 glyph card.
- Ogre and Goblins: 1 common squad (4 Goblin Cutters), 1 uncommon hero (Ogre Warhulk), 1 temporary Treasure Glyph (Belt of Giant Strength), 2 army cards, and 1 glyph card.
- Heroes of Khorvaire: 5 unique heroes (Kurrok the Elementalist, Rhogar Dragonspine, Mika Connour, Heirloom, Shurrak), 2 Shadow tiles, 1 permanent Treasure Glyph (Brooch of Shielding), 5 army cards, and 1 glyph card.

Moltenclaw's Invasion (November 2010): Wave D3

- Bugbears and Orcs: 2 common squads (3 Horned Skull Brutes, 3 Death Chasers of Thesk), 1 permanent Treasure Glyph (Giant Hunter Stone), 2 army cards, and 1 glyph card.
- Valkrill's Legion: 2 common squads (2 Mezzodemon Warmongers, 2 Death Knights of Valkrill), 1 uncommon hero (Ogre Pulverizer), 1 temporary Treasure Glyph (Scarab of Invulnerability), 3 army cards, 1 glyph card, and 2 Exoskeleton markers.
- Icewind Scourge: 3 uncommon heroes (Frost Giant of Mohr, Ice Troll Berserker, Master of the Hunt), 1 permanent Treasure Glyph (Oceanstrider Amulet), 3 army cards, and 1 glyph card.
- Heroes of Fallcrest: 4 unique heroes (Eltahale, Siege, Evar Scarcarver, Moltenclaw), 1 temporary Treasure Glyph (Revenant's Tome), 4 army cards, and 1 glyph card.

=== Large expansion sets ===
Orm's Return (July 2005): Character Set 1

- The Heroes of Laur: 5 figures (Charos, Dünd, Brunak, Deathwalker 8000, Su-Bak-Na), 5 army cards. Sometimes referred to as Wave 2.5, it shipped with Road to the Forgotten Forest, listed below.

The Road to the Forgotten Forest (July 2005) Terrain Set 1

- The Road to the Forgotten Forest: 1 figure (Dumutef Guard), 5 trees, 2 stone walls, 1 five-hex road tile, 8 one-hex road tiles, 8 two-hex road tiles, 1 army card, 1 game and scenario guide. Sometimes referred to as Wave 2.5, it shipped with Orm's Return, listed above.

Volcarren Wasteland (2005): Terrain Set 2

- Volcarren Wasteland: 3 figures (3 Obsidian Guards), 1 army card, 11 one-hex molten lava tiles, 5 one-hex lava field tiles, 5 two-hex lava field tiles, 4 seven-hex lava field tiles, 1 game and scenario guide. This was a Toys "R" Us exclusive.

Raknar's Vision (2006) Character Set 2

- Heroes of Lindesfarme: 5 figures (Jotun, Major Q9, Braxas, Nilfheim, Theracus), 5 army cards. Sometimes referred to as Wave 4.5, it shipped with Thaelenk Tundra, listed below.

Thaelenk Tundra (2006) Terrain Set 3

- Thaelenk Tundra: 3 figures (Dzu-Teh), 1 army card, 6 glaciers, 21 ice tiles, 12 single-hex and 12 double-hex snow tiles. Sometimes referred to as Wave 4.5, it shipped with Raknar's Vision, listed above.

Fortress of the Archkyrie (August 2006) Terrain Set 4

- Fortress of the Archkyrie: Castle and terrain, no figures. 141 pieces and new castle scenarios.

Aquilla's Alliance (June 2008) Character Set 3

- The Heroes of the Quagmire: 5 figures (Wo-Sa-Ga, Sujoah, Zetacron, Zelrig, Gurei-Oni), 5 army cards. It is shipped with Ticalla Jungle, listed below.

Ticalla Jungle (June 2008): Terrain Set 5

- Fyorlag Spiders (Squad of three spiders). Shrubs and palm trees

Battle for the Wellspring (August 2024): Battle Box by Renegade Game Studios

- Figures: Killian Vane III, Fia Bonny the Void Siren, Bok-Bur-Na, Ewashia Master of Tides, Kita the Springrunner, Onshu the Welkineye
- Terrain

The Grove at Laur's End (August 2024): Terrain Expansion by Renegade Game Studios

- Laur Jungle Trees, Laur Jungle Bushes

Revna's Rebuke (October 2024): Renegade Game Studios

- Kyrie Warriors Army Expansion
- Iron Lich Viscerot and Necrotech Wraithriders Army Expansion

Lands of Valhalla (October 2024)

Waters of Valhalla (October 2024)

Rising Tide (2025)

- Knight Primus Adelbern & Ordo Borealis Army Expansion, Sonlen & Halushia, Scion of the Wild Army Expansion, Hellforge Mandukor Army Expansion (February 2025)
- Queen Maladrix & Festering Honor Guard Army Expansion, Oathbound Legionnaires & Oathbound Phalanx Army Expansion, Wing Commander Tuck Harrigan & Vorid Glide Strikers Army Expansion (April 2025)

The Swamps of Valhalla (February 2025)

The Snow Fields of Valhalla (February 2025)

== Promotional sets ==
Crest of the Valkyrie (December 2006): (Five figures exclusively distributed through Toys "R" Us.). Flagbearers represent each of the five Valkyrie Generals, the major factions of Heroscape. Each flagbearer includes special dice that activate some of their powers and embroidered dice bag. The five flagbearers are:

- Jandar is represented by a Knight named Sir Gilbert. Grants extra attack and move bonuses to squad figures.
- Utgar is represented by an Orc named Ornak. Grants extra attack to Orcs that follow Utgar
- Ullar is represented by an Elf named Acolarh. Protects elves that follow Ullar
- Vydar is represented by a Primadon named Laglor. Grants a range enhancement to followers of Vydar
- Einar is represented by a Samurai named Hatamoto Taro. Grants extra defense to followers of Einar

Elite Onyx Vipers (2005)

- This was a promotional squad that was originally only available bundled with Master Sets sold at Walmart during the 2005 holiday season, but later reprinted in the Wave 10 Special Collection, Valkrill's Gambit. The figure sculpts are identical to the Venoc Vipers, but were cast in black plastic. The squad is much stronger and costs more than double the number of points as the Venocs. Their special power, "Evasive 8", adds 8 defense onto their existing 2 defense when defending from a ranged attack, creating a nearly impenetrable 10 defense.

Nerak the Glacian Swog Rider (August 2005)

- This was a promotional figure distributed free of charge at the 2005 Gen Con, again later on at special Toys "R" Us events, and also reprinted in the Wave 10 Special Collection, Valkrill's Gambit. The figure sculpt is identical to the Swog Rider, but the swog is cast in grey/white plastic. The differences between Nerak and the normal Swog Rider is that one power is changed, an additional one is granted and he costs 25 more points. He is also a unique figure.

Sir Hawthorne (August 2006)

- This was a promotional figure distributed free of charge at the 2006 Gen Con, and later reprinted in the Wave 10 Special Collection, Valkrill's Gambit. The figure sculpt is identical to one of the Knights of Weston, but is detailed in black armor instead of its original coloring. This figure, at the time of its release, is the only figure named after a fan of the game: Jerry "Grungebob" Hawthorne, a longtime fan, former play-tester, and frequent contributor to the Heroscape community.

Master Win Chiu Woo (July 2007)

- This was a promotional figure distributed free of charge at the 2007 San Diego Comic-Con. The figure sculpt is identical to one of the Shaolin Monks, though repainted in the yellow and gray of the sixth general, Aquilla. A unique hero, Master Woo improves the attack, defense, and mobility of Shaolin Monk squads.

Agent Skahen (August 2008)

- This was a promotional figure distributed free of charge at the 2008 Gen Con. The figure sculpt is identical to one of the Nakita Agents, though repainted in a black suit and hair.

Age of Annihilation (August 2024–April 2025)

- Various promotional figures were released alongside Age of Annihilation: Sgt. Drake Alexander, Shiori, Cornelius Breech the Derelict Prince, Thyraxis Dragoon, Major Q11

== Unreleased content ==
Marvel: Reinforcements Arrive (unreleased): Marvel Expansion Set 1

- Figures for a Marvel expansion were previewed at the 2007 San Diego Comic-Con. As of Heroscape's discontinuation in 2010, the expansion was never released. The expansion consisted of an additional ten figures: Sandman, Doctor Octopus, Human Torch, Punisher, Super-Skrull, Bullseye, Invisible Woman, The Thing, Beast, and Black Panther.

Samuel Brown (November 2010)

- Brown was intended to be the next promotional figure, but Heroscape was discontinued before the figure could be physically produced. The sculpt would have been identical to one of the 4th Massachusetts Line, though repainted with a brown uniform and other color changes. Some time after the discontinuation of the game, the volunteer design team secured permission to publish a digital version of the army card for Samuel Brown along with photos of the intended paint scheme, so that interested players could repaint an extra copy of a suitable figure and make their own physical copy of the "last official Heroscape figure."
