= Marcellin Marbot =

French general (1782–1854)

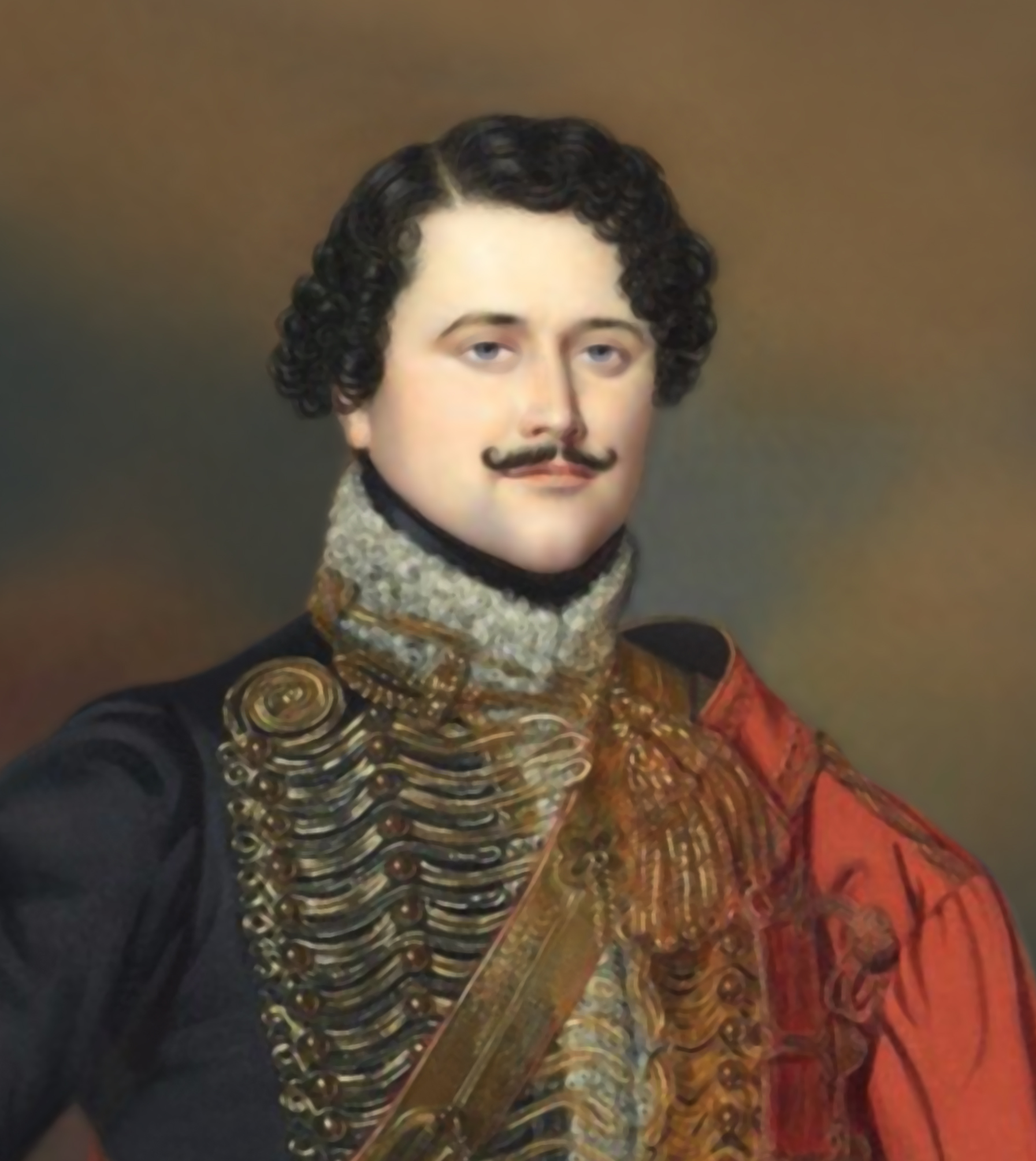
- Marbot as a colonel commander of the 7th Hussar Regiment in 1815
- Born: Jean-Baptiste Antoine Marcelin Marbot; 18 August 1782; Altillac, France
- Died: 16 November 1854 (aged 72); Paris, France
- Burial place: Père Lachaise Cemetery
- Relatives: Jean-Antoine Marbot, Divisional general (Father); Antoine Adolphe Marcelin Marbot, Maréchal de camp (Brother); François Certain de Canrobert, Marshal of France (Cousin)
- Military career
- Allegiance: French Republic; French Empire; Kingdom of France; Kingdom of France; French Republic
- Service years: 1799–1848
- Rank: Lieutenant-Général (Divisional general)
- Nickname: Marbot the Younger
- Conflicts: Napoleonic Wars; Battle of Marengo; Battle of Austerlitz; Battle of Eylau; Battle of Friedland; Siege of Zaragoza; Battle of Essling; Battle of Wagram; Battle of Leipzig; Battle of Waterloo; Siege of Antwerp; French conquest of Algeria
- Awards: Order of the Legion of Honour (Grand Officer); Order of Saint Louis (Knight); Order of Leopold (Commander); Order of the Oak Crown (Grand Cross)
- Other work: Member of the Chamber of Peers

Jean-Baptiste Antoine Marcelin Marbot (Note: "Marcelin" is spelt with one "l" in Marbot's birth certificate and official documents.) (English: /mɑːrˈboʊ/ mar-BOH, French: [ʒɑ̃ batist ɑ̃twan maʁsəlɛ̃ maʁbo]; 18 August 1782 – 16 November 1854), known as Marcellin Marbot, (Note: "Marcellin" is spelt with two "l"s in certain service records and is the spelling used by Marbot. He is also sometimes known as "Jean-Baptiste Marbot".) was a French general, famous for his memoirs depicting the Napoleonic age of warfare. He belongs to a family that has distinguished itself particularly in the career of arms, giving three generals to France in less than 50 years. His elder brother, Adolphe Marbot, was also a general.

== Biography ==
=== Early life ===
Jean-Baptiste Antoine Marcelin Marbot was born into a family of military nobility in Altillac, in the ancient province of Quercy in southwestern France. He was the younger son of General Jean-Antoine Marbot, who had served as aide-de-camp to Lieutenant-Général de Schomberg, inspector general of the cavalry in the military household of the king of France.

After completing his studies at the Military College of Sorèze (1793–1798), he joined the 1st Hussar Regiment as a volunteer on 3 September 1799. Serving under General Jean-Mathieu Seras, he was promoted to the rank of sergeant on 1 December 1799, and later that month, to second lieutenant on 31 December in recognition of his bravery. He fought with the Army of Italy and took part in the Siege of Genoa, during which his father, General Jean-Antoine Marbot died, and subsequently fought in the Battle of Marengo.

Upon returning to France, he joined the 25th Chasseur Regiment on 11 June 1801 and was detached to the Cavalry School at Versailles.

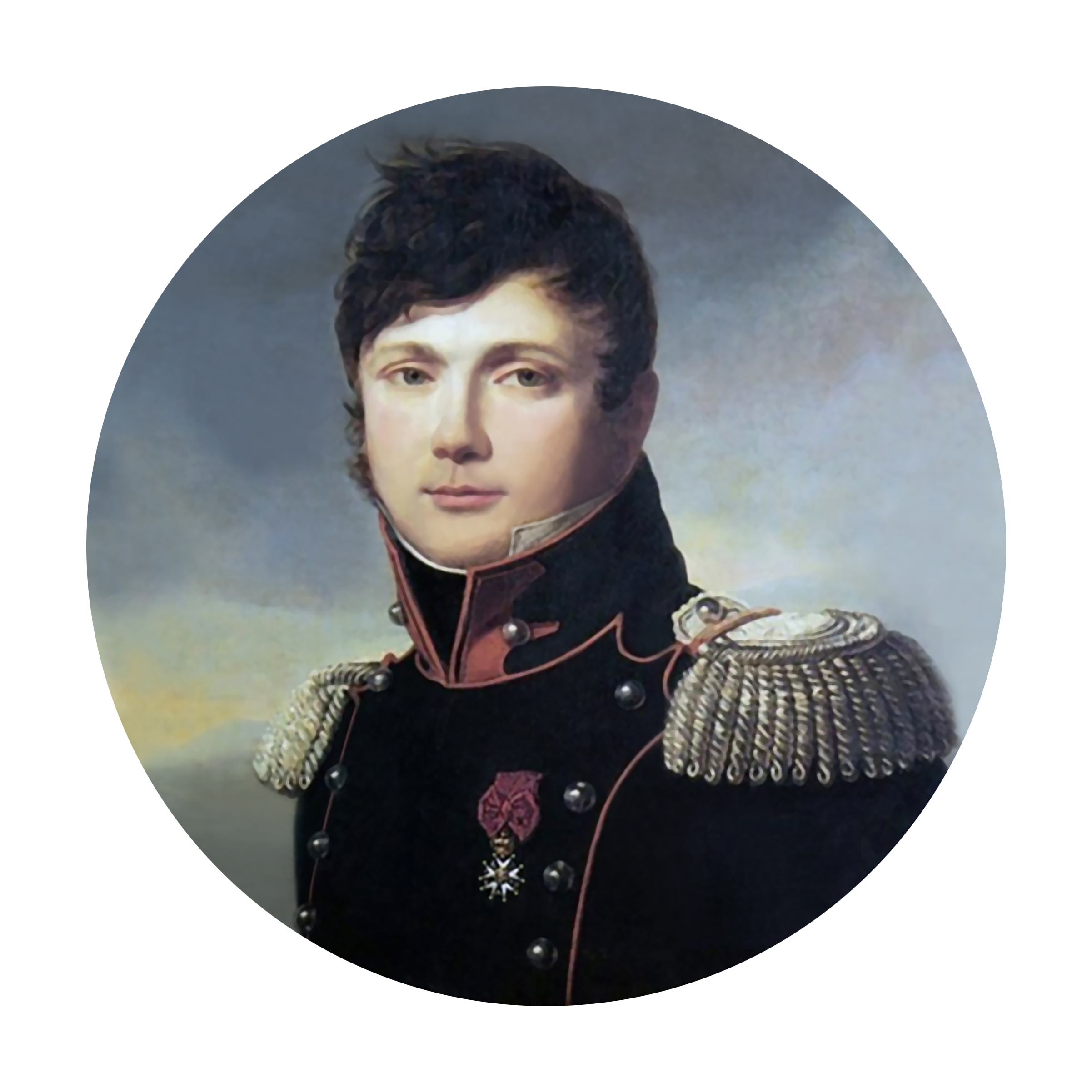
Marbot as a colonel of the 23rd Chasseur Regiment in 1812

=== Napoleonic wars ===
On 31 August 1803 he became aide-de-camp to General Charles-Pierre Augereau and was promoted to the rank of lieutenant on 11 July 1804. Having distinguished himself at the Battle of Austerlitz, he fought in the VII corps of the Grande Armée during the 1806–1807 campaign against the Kingdom of Prussia and the Russian Empire.

On 3 January 1807 he was promoted to the rank of captain and took part in the Battle of Eylau, during the course of which he nearly lost his life, recalling in his memoirs:

Stretched on the snow among the piles of dead and dying, unable to move in any way, I gradually and without pain lost consciousness… I judge that my swoon lasted four hours, and when I came to my sense I found myself in this horrible position. I was completely naked, having nothing on but my hat and my right boot. A man of the transport corps, thinking me dead, had stripped me in the usual fashion, and wishing to pull off the only boot that remained, was dragging me by one leg with his foot against my body. The jerk which the man gave me no doubt had restored me to my senses. I succeeded in sitting up and spitting out the clots of blood from my throat. The shock caused by the wind of the ball had produced such an extravasation of blood, that my face, shoulders, and chest were black, while the rest of my body was stained red by the blood from my wound. My hat and my hair were full of bloodstained snow, and as I rolled my haggard eyes I must have been horrible to see. Anyhow, the transport man looked the other way, and went off with my property without my being able to say a single word to him, so utterly prostrate was I. But I had recovered my mental faculties and my thoughts turned towards God and my mother. The setting sun cast some feeble rays through the clouds. I took what I believed to be a last farwell of it.

Marbot was saved by the fact that his stolen clothes and pocket watch were recognised by his valet when the soldier returned with them, and the valet searched for his body for burial, only to find Marbot clinging to life despite his wounds and onsetting hypothermia.

Subsequently, he served in the Peninsular War under Marshals Jean Lannes and André Masséna, and showed himself to be a dashing leader of light cavalry in the Russian campaign of 1812.

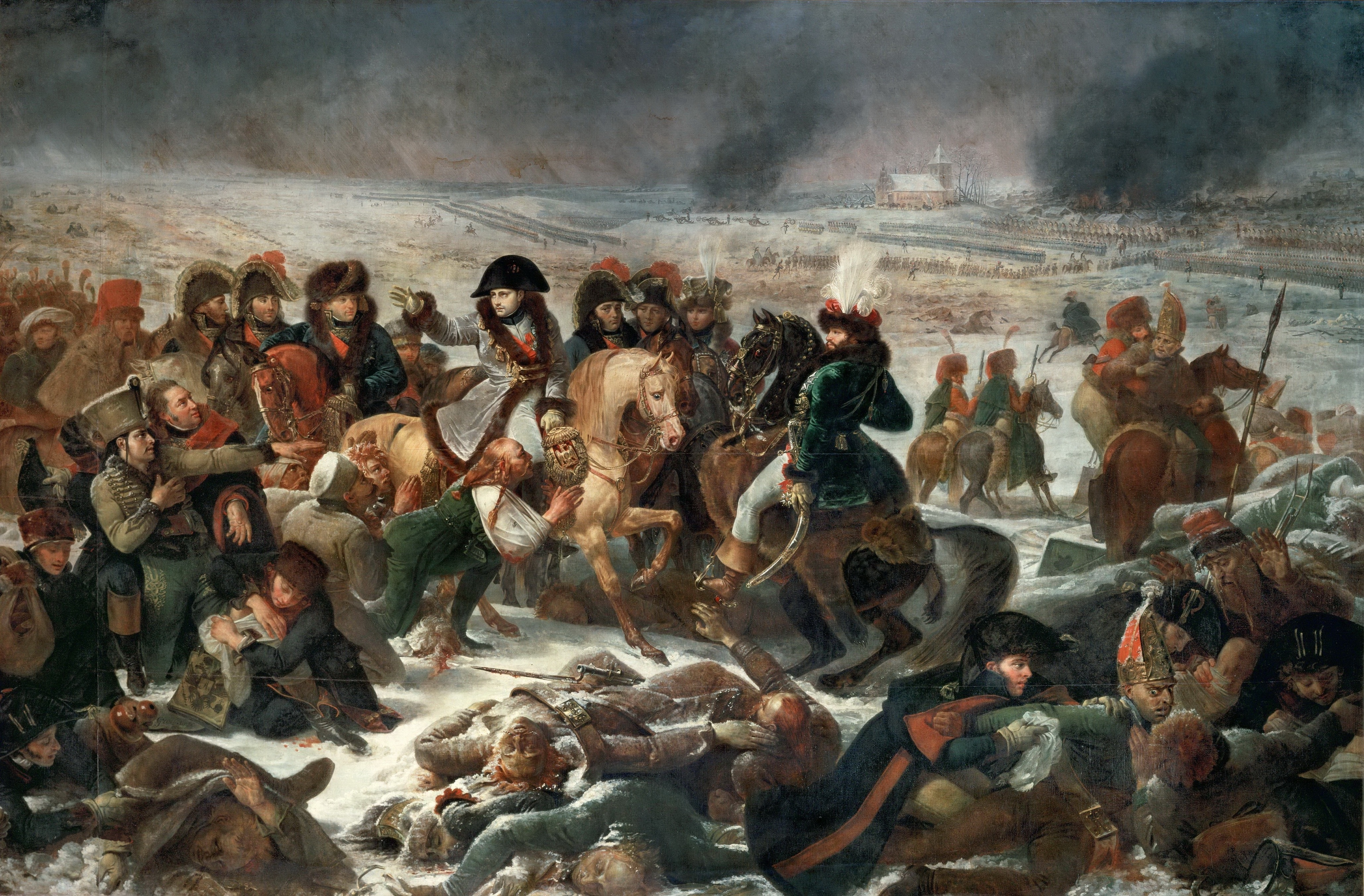
The Battle of Eylau in 1807, during which the young Captain Marbot nearly lost his life

He was promoted to the rank of colonel on 15 November 1812 and took part in the German campaign of 1813 as commander of the 23rd Chasseur Regiment. During the morning of the first day of the Battle of Leipzig, Marbot nearly altered the course of the war when his regiment came close to capturing the Tsar of Russia, Alexander I and the King of Prussia, Frederick William III, as they had strayed from their escort. After a slow recovery from the wounds he had sustained at the battles of Leipzig and Hanau, he rallied to Emperor Napoleon during the Hundred Days, leading the 7th Hussar Regiment at the Battle of Waterloo.

After Napoleon's final defeat in 1815, he was exiled during the early years of the Bourbon Restoration, returning to France in 1819.

=== July Monarchy ===
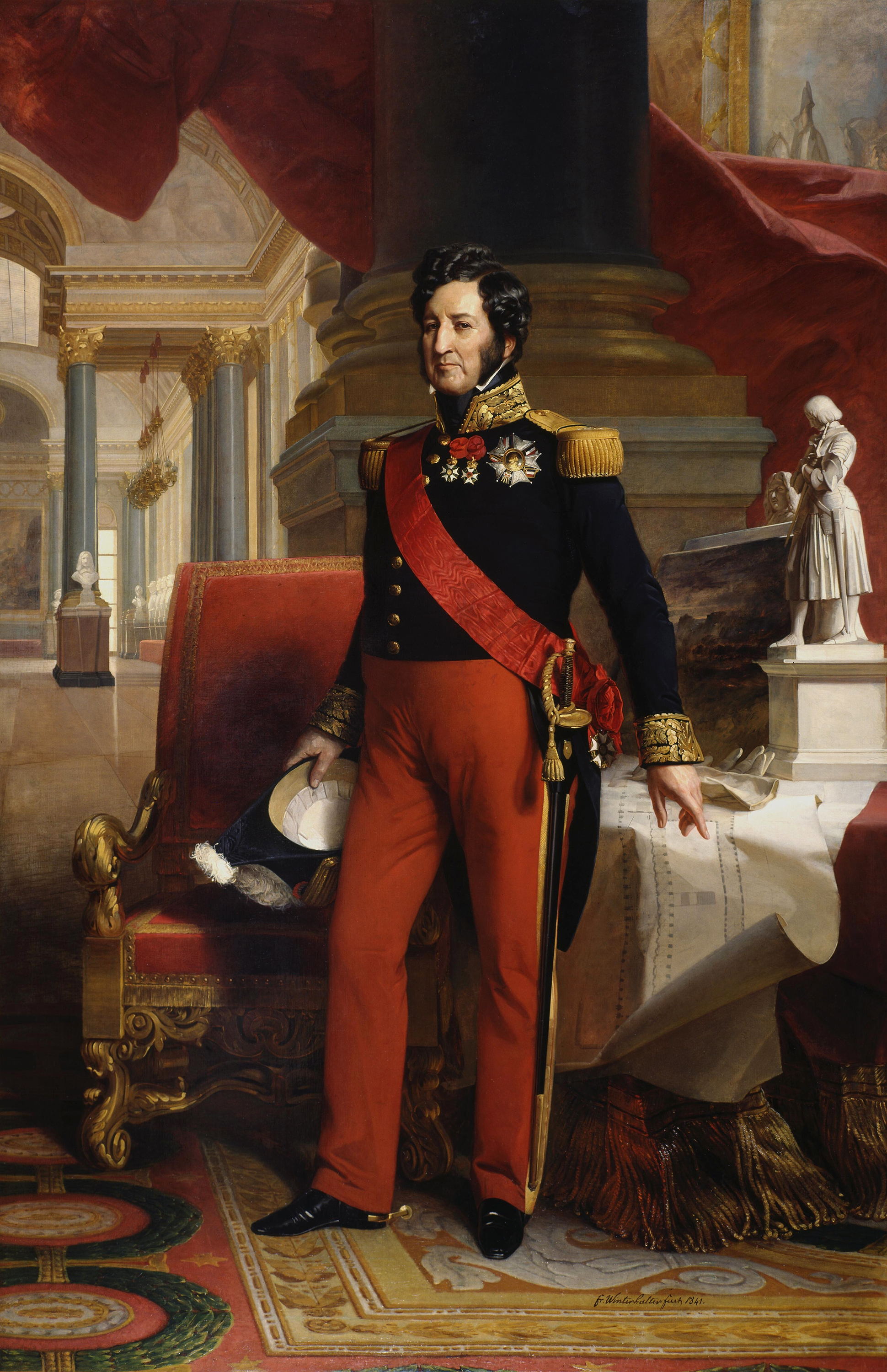
Portrait of Louis Philippe I by Franz Xaver Winterhalter

During the July Monarchy, his close relationship with King Louis Philippe I and his son, Prince Ferdinand Philippe of Orléans secured him important military appointments. He was promoted to the rank of maréchal de camp (brigadier general), and was present in this capacity at the Siege of Antwerp in 1832.

From 1835 to 1840 he served in various Algerian expeditions, and was promoted to the rank of lieutenant-général (divisional general) in 1836. In 1845 he became a member of the Chamber of Peers. Three years later, after the fall of King Louis Philippe I, he retired into private life.

== Family ==
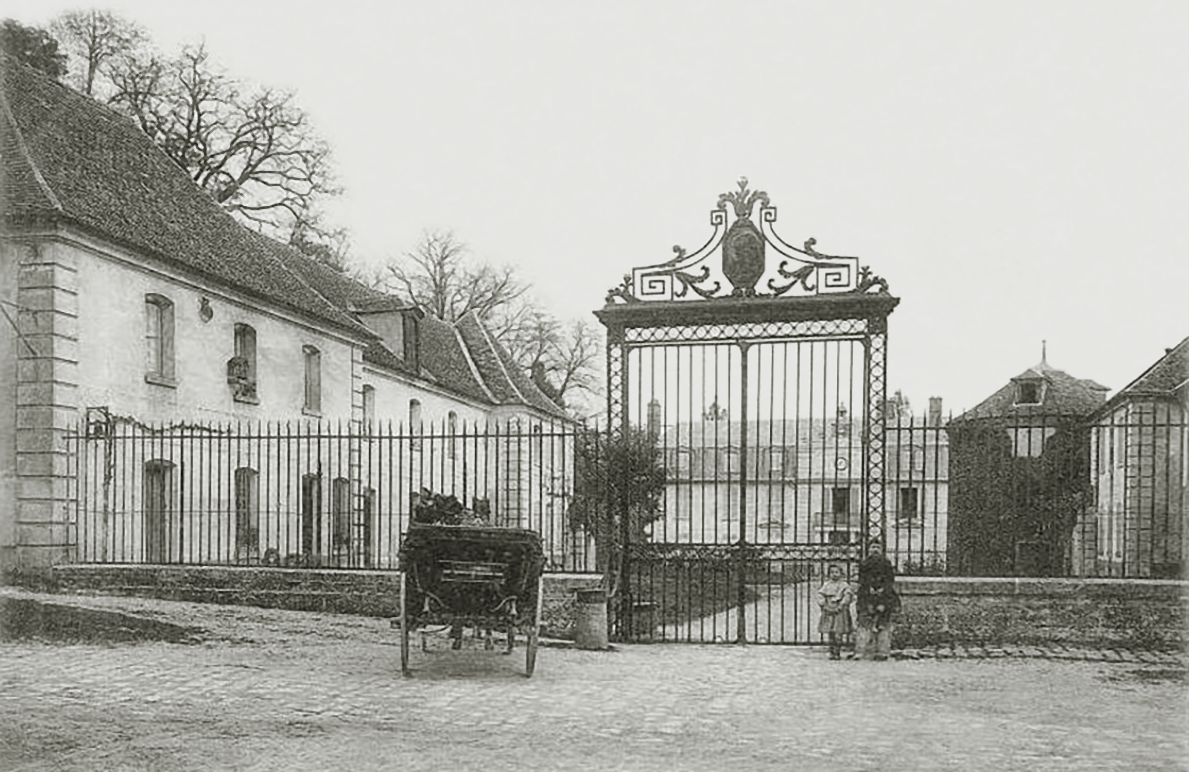
Château du Rancy in Bonneuil-sur-Marne

His father, General Jean-Antoine Marbot, had four sons, only two whom reached adulthood: Antoine Adolphe Marcelin, the elder, maréchal de camp (brigadier general) during the July Monarchy, and Jean-Baptiste Antoine Marcelin, the younger. Through his mother, he was the cousin of François Certain de Canrobert, Marshal of France during the Second French Empire.

On 5 November 1811, he married Angélique Marie Caroline Personne-Desbrières (1790–1873), and by this alliance became the owner of the Château du Rancy in Bonneuil-sur-Marne. They had two sons:

- Adolphe Charles Alfred, known as Alfred (1812–1865): Painter, historian and uniformologist.
- Charles Nicolas Marcelin, known as Charles (1820–1882): Whose daughter Marguerite first published her grandfather's famous Memoirs.

== Decorations ==
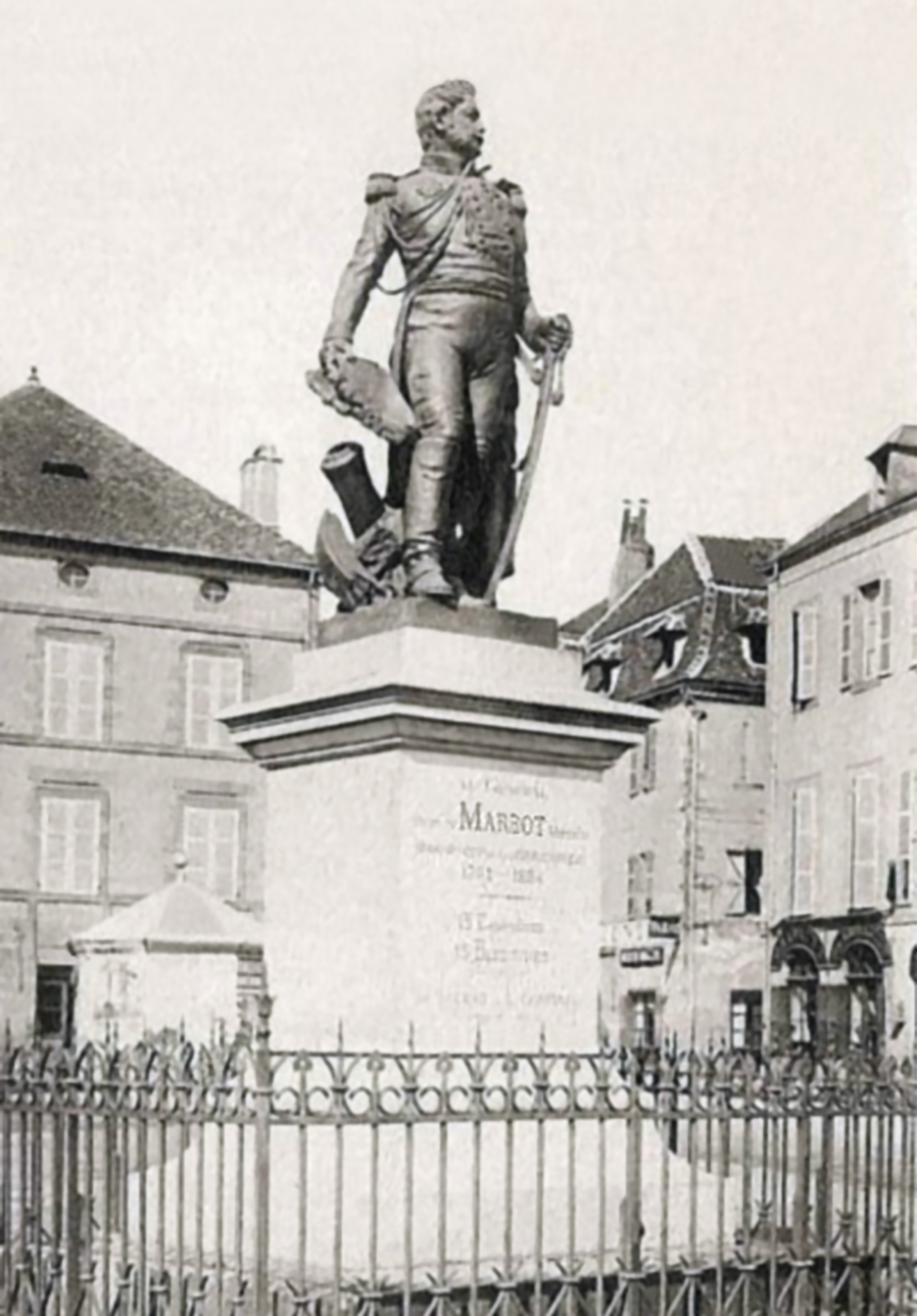
Statue of General Marbot in Beaulieu-sur-Dordogne

Marbot received the following decorations:

French Empire

- National Order of the Legion of Honour:
  - Knight: 16 October 1808.
  - Officer: 28 September 1813.

Kingdom of France

- Royal and Military Order of Saint Louis:
  - Knight: 6 June 1827.

Kingdom of France

- Royal Order of the Legion of Honour:
  - Commander: 21 March 1831.
  - Grand Officer: 30 April 1836.

Kingdom of Belgium

- Order of Leopold:
  - Commander: 10 March 1833.

Grand Duchy of Luxembourg

- Order of the Oak Crown:
  - Grand Cross: 9 September 1842.

== Wounds and injuries ==
Marbot endured 13 wounds and injuries during his service:

- A bayonet stab to the left arm, received while he was left stunned by the "wind" of a cannonball that had just flown through his bicorn hat, at the Battle of Eylau: 8 February 1807.
- A sword slash to the forehead at Ágreda: 1 November 1808.
- A gunshot through the upper body at the Siege of Zaragoza: 9 February 1809.
- A gunshot to the right thigh at the Battle of Essling: 22 May 1809.
- A gunshot to the left wrist at the Battle of Znaim: 12 July 1809.
- A sword slash to the face and a sword stab to the belly at the Battle of Casal Novo: 14 March 1811.
- A gunshot to the left shoulder at the Battle of Klyastitsy: 31 July 1812.
- A lance stab to the right knee at Plyeshchanitsy: 4 December 1812.
- An arrow hit to the right thigh (fired by Russia's Bashkir horse archers) at the Battle of Leipzig: 18 October 1813.
- A lance stab to the chest at the Battle of Waterloo: 18 June 1815.
- A gunshot to the left knee at Médéa during the Algerian expedition: 12 May 1840.

== Literary works ==
=== Publications ===
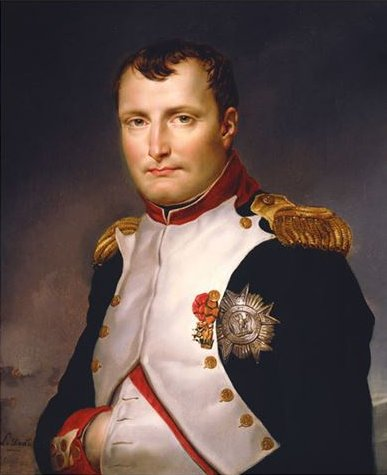
Portrait of Napoleon by Jacques-Louis David

In exile after the Battle of Waterloo, Marbot returned to France in 1819 and wrote two books:

- Critical remarks on the work of Lieutenant-Général Rogniat, entitled: Considerations on the art of war (1820).
- On the necessity of increasing the military forces of France; means of achieving this in the most cost-efficient way possible (1825).

The first publication was a reply to General Joseph Rogniat's treatise on war, in which Marbot effectively contrasted the human factor in war with Rogniat's pure theory. The second presented his recommendations for the future development of the French Armed Forces.

Napoleon read the first publication while in exile on the island of Saint Helena. His aide-de-camp, General Henri Gatien Bertrand recorded in his diary on 14 March 1821:

In the evening, the Emperor handed me Marbot's book, [...] and said: "That is the best book I have read for four years. It is the one that has given me the greatest amount of pleasure. [...] He has expressed some things better than I did, he was more familiar with them because, on the whole, he was more of a Corps commander than I. [...] Throughout the book he never refers to 'the Emperor'. He wanted the King of France [Louis XVIII] to give him an appointment with the rank of Colonel; that is quite obvious. He uses 'Emperor' once, so as not to look as though he were afraid to do so, or to appear cowardly, and another time he uses 'Napoleon'. He mentions Masséna and Augereau frequently, and he has described the Battle of Essling better than I could have done it myself [...]. I should have liked to show Marbot my appreciation by sending him a ring. If I ever return to active life, I will have him attached to me as an aide-de-camp [...].

This publication earned Marbot the distinction of being remembered in Napoleon's will:

To Colonel Marbot, one hundred thousand francs. I recommend him to continue to write in defence of the glory of the French armies, and to confound their calumniators and apostates.

=== Memoirs ===
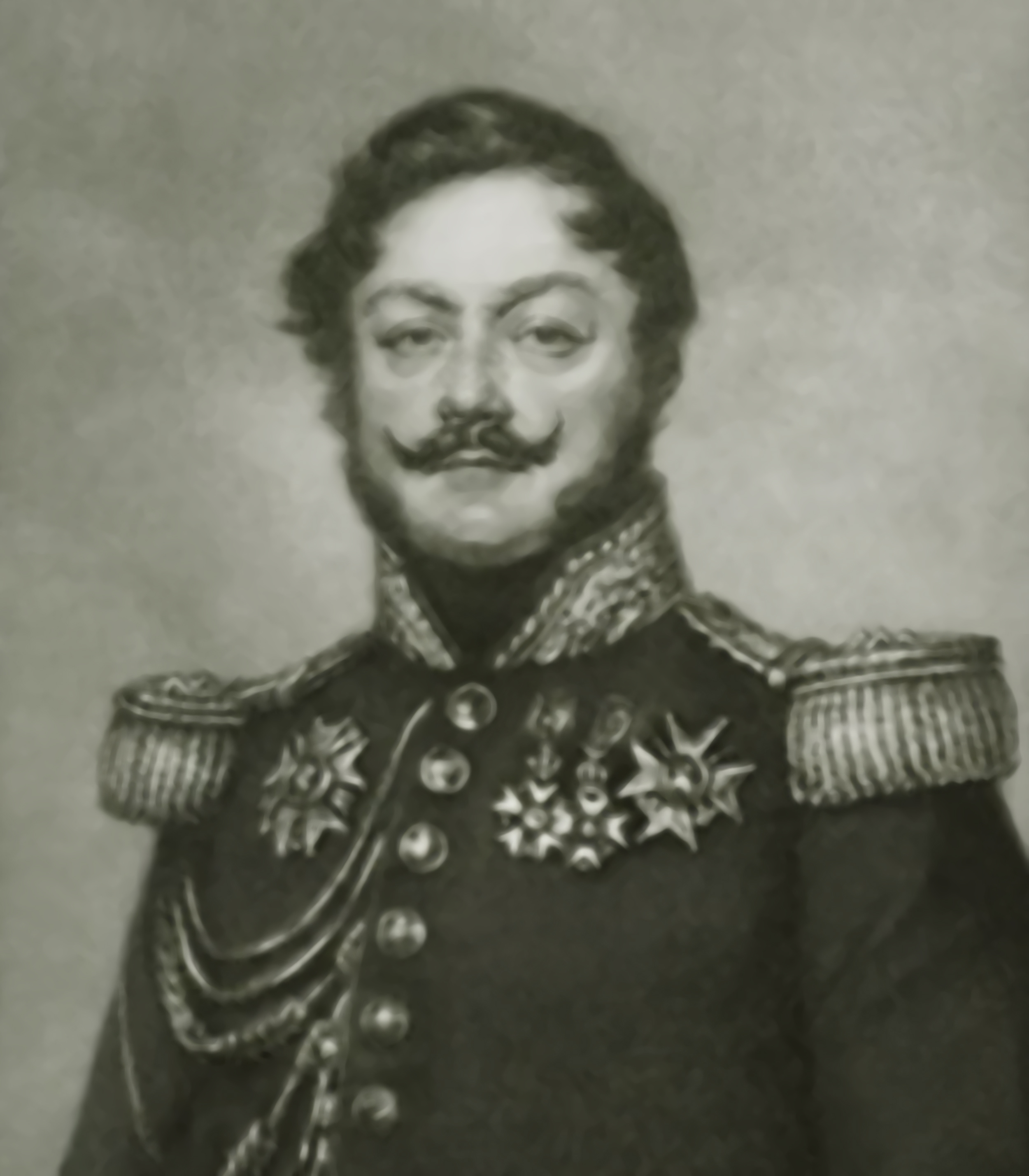
General Marbot in 1840

His fame rests chiefly on the Memoirs of his life and campaigns, the Memoirs of General Baron de Marbot, which were written for his children and published posthumously in Paris, in 1891. An English translation by Arthur John Butler was published in London, in 1892. Marbot's Memoirs were widely acclaimed, and Arthur Conan Doyle wrote of them:

The first of all soldier books in the world. [...] There are few books which I could not spare from my shelves better than the Memoirs of the gallant Marbot.

=== Literary references ===
Several authors and personalities have cited Marbot and his Memoirs in their works:

- Andrew Lang's collections of stories written by various authors feature selected excerpts from Marbot's Memoirs. Three appear in The Red True Story Book collection (1895): "Marbot's March", "Eylau. The Mare Lisette" and "How Marbot crossed the Danube". Another two appear in The All Sorts of Stories Book collection (1911): "How the Russian Soldier was Saved" and "Marbot and the Young Cossack".
- In Arthur Conan Doyle's novel Through the Magic Door (1907), the author shares his admiration for Marbot's Memoirs with his readers. Doyle also modelled the fictional comedic character of Brigadier Gerard, the most entertaining of all his characters, on a number of real-life sources from the Napoleonic era, among them Marbot.
- In Theodore Roosevelt's writings and public statements, Marbot is cited on two occasions. He is mentioned in Roosevelt's address Biological Analogies in History (1910), delivered at the University of Oxford, and in his publication A Book Lover's Holiday in the Open (1916).
- In Virginia Woolf's novel Mrs Dalloway (1925), there are several mentions of the protagonist Clarissa Dalloway reading Marbot's Memoirs.
- As with a number of other historical figures, Marbot appears prominently in the Riverworld cycle of science-fiction novels (1967–1983) by Philip José Farmer. Marbot is first featured as the commander of Marines on Sam Clemens' riverboat, the Not for Hire. After the destruction of that boat and the death of its captain, Marbot joins the group led by famed English explorer Sir Richard Francis Burton and accompanies him on the journey to the head of the River. Accompanied by his lover, the English author Aphra Behn, Marbot reaches the Tower at the head of the River, only to die in combat when androids based on characters from Alice Through the Looking-Glass attack the guests during a Lewis Carroll-themed party.
- In Marc Bloch's book The Historian's Craft (1949), he uses the story of Marbot crossing the Danube, along with various documentary evidence, as an example of historical criticism unearthing erroneous history-writing, citing sources as wide-ranging as the Commentaries of Julius Caesar and the Protocols of the Elders of Zion.
- In Ronald Frederick Delderfield's novel To Serve Them All My Days (1972), the protagonist David Powlett-Jones gets comfort from Marbot's Memoirs during his time in the trenches, and again on the death of his wife and daughter in a road accident.

== Eponyms ==
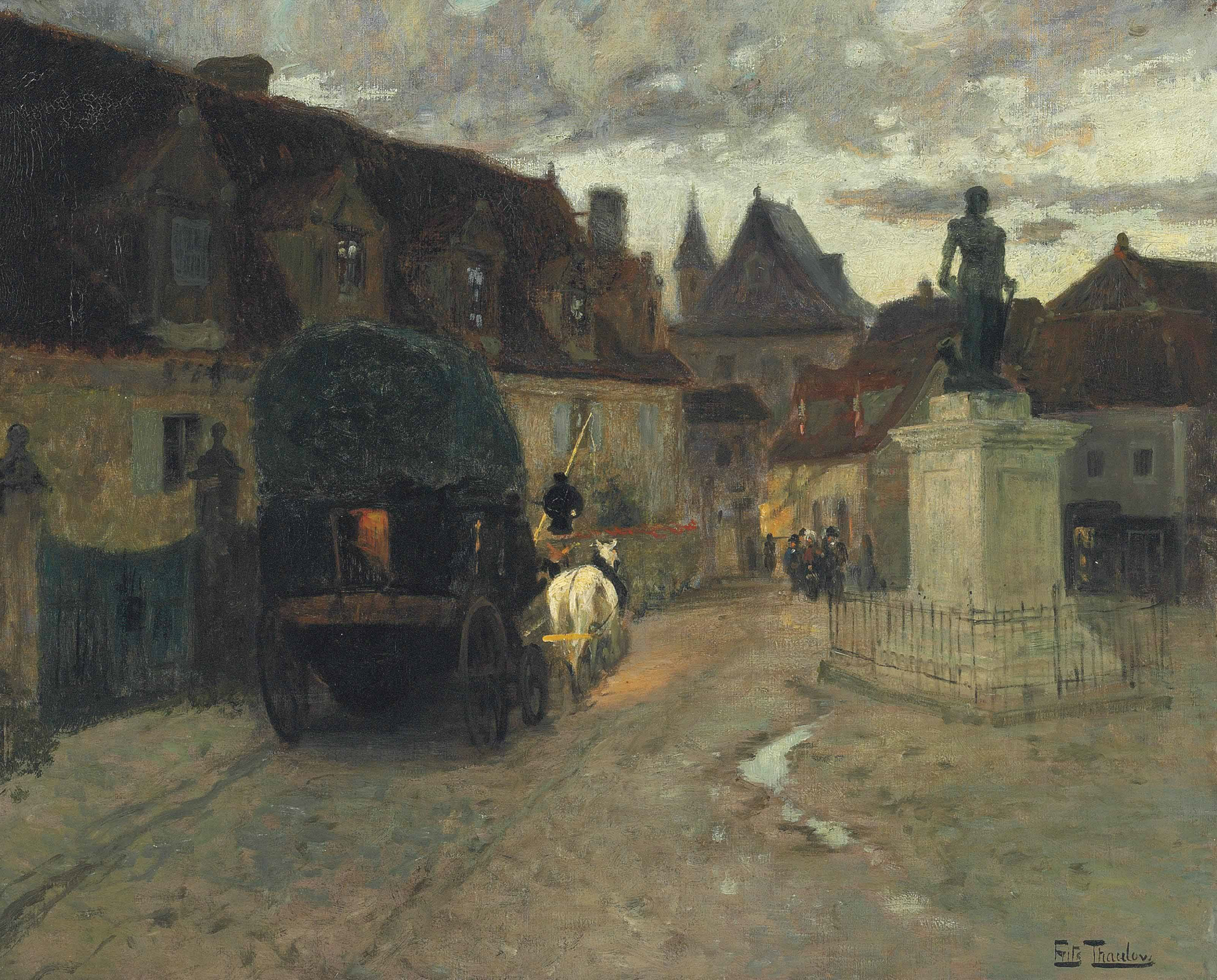
Place Marbot in Beaulieu-sur-Dordogne by Frits Thaulow

Several places and buildings have been named after Marbot:

- Place Marbot, the central square of Beaulieu-sur-Dordogne, department of Corrèze, France.
- Avenue des Généraux Marbot, the principal avenue of Altillac, department of Corrèze, France.
- Hôtel Marbot, a château in Tulle, department of Corrèze in France and seat of the Departmental Council of Corrèze.
- Marbot Lake, a lake in Baie-James, Quebec, Canada.
- Marbot, previous name of the town of Tarik Ibn Ziad in Aïn Defla Province, Algeria.

== See also ==
- List of French military leaders
- Napoleonic Wars
- Marbot family
- Jean-Antoine Marbot
- Adolphe Marbot
