= Spartacus: Gods of the Arena =

American television miniseries; prequel to Spartacus

- Genre: Historical drama Sword-and-sandal
- Created by: Steven S. DeKnight
- Written by: Steven S. DeKnight; Maurissa Tancharoen; Jed Whedon; Aaron Helbing; Todd Helbing; Seamus Kevin Fahey; Misha Green; Brent Fletcher
- Directed by: Jesse Warn; Rick Jacobson; Michael Hurst; Brendan Maher; John Fawcett
- Starring: John Hannah; Manu Bennett; Peter Mensah; Dustin Clare; Jaime Murray; Nick E. Tarabay; Marisa Ramirez; Lucy Lawless
- Theme music composer: Joseph LoDuca
- Country of origin: United States
- Original language: English
- No. of episodes: 6

Production
- Producers: Steven S. DeKnight; Robert Tapert; Chloe Smith; Charles Knight; Aaron Lam; Sam Raimi
- Editor: Allanah Milne
- Running time: 50 minutes
- Production companies: DeKnight Productions; Starz Originals

Original release
- Network: Starz
- Release: January 21 – February 25, 2011

Related
- Spartacus

Spartacus: Gods of the Arena is a television miniseries created by Steven S. DeKnight for Starz. It is a prequel to Spartacus, which premiered in 2011. The series follows the character Gannicus (Dustin Clare), the first gladiator representing Lentulus Batiatus to become Champion of Capua. Cast members and characters reprised from the original series include John Hannah as Batiatus, Lucy Lawless as Lucretia, Peter Mensah as Oenomaus, Nick E. Tarabay as Ashur, Lesley-Ann Brandt as Naevia, Antonio Te Maioha as Barca, and Manu Bennett as Crixus.

The miniseries aired in Canada on Movie Central and The Movie Network, on Sky1 in the United Kingdom and on FX in Latin America.

== Cast ==
Slaves

- Dustin Clare as Gannicus – a Celtic gladiator who is the champion of the Batiatus' ludus.
- Peter Mensah as Oenomaus / Doctore – a Numidian gladiator who later becomes the doctore of Batiatus' gladiators.
- Marisa Ramirez as Melitta – Lucretia's body slave, the wife of Oenomaus.
- Manu Bennett as Crixus – a new Gallic gladiatorial recruit.
- Nick E. Tarabay as Ashur – a new Syrian gladiatorial recruit.
- Shane Rangi as Dagan – a gladiatorial recruit who speaks only Aramaic, and fellow Syrian to Ashur.
- Antonio Te Maioha as Barca – a Carthaginian gladiator.
- Josef Brown as Auctus – a gladiator and Barca's lover.
- Temuera Morrison as Ulpius / Doctore – Oenomaus' predecessor as the trainer of Batiatus' gladiators.
- Lesley-Ann Brandt as Naevia – a young house-slave.
- Jessica Grace Smith as Diona – a house-slave and Naevia's friend who loses her virginity at the whim of Cossutius.

Romans

- John Hannah as Quintus Lentulus Batiatus – a lanista
- Lucy Lawless as Lucretia – Batiatus' wife.
- Jaime Murray as Gaia – a social climber and Lucretia's friend.
- Craig Walsh Wrightson as Marcus Decius Solonius – Batiatus' close friend who has aspirations of becoming a lanista himself.
- Jeffrey Thomas as Titus Lentulus Batiatus – Quintus Batiatus' father and the pater familias of the House of Batiatus.
- Stephen Lovatt as Tullius – Batiatus' brutal business rival and enemy.
- Gareth Williams as Vettius – owner of a rival ludus and enemy of Batiatus.

== Episodes ==
No.	Title	Directed by	Written by	Original release date	US viewers (millions)
1	"Past Transgressions"	Jesse Warn	Steven S. DeKnight	January 21, 2011	1.10
Opening around five years before the arrival of Spartacus, Batiatus finds himself administering his father's ludus, while his father is in Sicily living in semi-retirement. Seeking fame, he (with the support of his old friend Solonius) tries to win favor with a local nobleman, Tullius, by paying 50 dinars for a Gallic slave worth only 10 named Crixus - by noting his potential to be a great fighter. Arriving at the ludus, Crixus soon meets veteran gladiator Oenomaus (who has a slave wife named Melitta), as well as Syrian slave recruits Ashur and Dagan. Meanwhile, Lucretia welcomes the sudden return to Capua of Gaia, a young but recently widowed friend, and "party girl" from Rome who is attracted to both the delights of the ludus and of opium. In an attempt to participate in the opening games of the soon to be completed arena, Batiatus selects his most skilled gladiator, Gannicus the Celt, the original champion of the House of Batiatus, for a duel in the marketplace. Batiatus rewards Gannicus with women and drinks. Unknown to Batiatus, however, is that young Vettius, the owner of a rival ludus, is merely an agent of Tullius -- leading to deadly consequences as Batiatus is soon outmaneuvered in his own game. Lucretia and Gaia get intimate. Tullius wishes to purchase Gannicus and when Batiatus refuses the offer, Batiatus is savagely beaten and humiliated.
2	"Missio"	Rick Jacobson	Maurissa Tancharoen & Jed Whedon	January 28, 2011	1.14
A week has now passed since the murder of his bodyguard and severe beating at the hands of Tullius' men and Batiatus continues to recover. Tullius sends Batiatus a message, via Batiatus' good friend Solonius, and offers to double his offer for Gannicus to 400 Denarii. Batiatus is in no mood to compromise, however, and soon plans his own revenge on Vettius with the aid of the Syrians. Quintillius Varis comes to Capua to select gladiators for his games, but Gaia and Lucretia seemingly bump into Varis, and offer to have Varis wait at Batiatus' house -- where Batiatus will seemingly act surprised, but then offer his ludus' services instead. The Syrians are rewarded with the brotherhood mark. Meanwhile, Doctore is irked when Batiatus criticizes him as his father's man, and names Oenomaus to succeed him. Shamed, Doctore suddenly challenges Oenomaus to a duel, in which Oenomaus eventually kills him and becomes the new Doctore. Meanwhile, inside the ludus, Gannicus (victorious from his bout with Crixus) and Melitta are ordered to have sex for Varis' entertainment, leaving both Melitta and Gannicus troubled, but with Batiatus succeeding in securing the position of primus for Gannicus in the upcoming games. Batiatus, Lucretia and Gaia celebrate together.
3	"Paterfamilias"	Michael Hurst	Aaron Helbing & Todd Helbing	February 4, 2011	1.26
Quintus Batiatus is pleased with himself for having arranged Varis' primus. Quintus and the household are not, however, prepared for the sudden return of the lanista and pater familias, Quintus’s father, Titus, who treats his son's caretaking skills with disdain. Titus laughs when he hears that Gannicus will represent the house Batiatus in the games, and sets out to make amends with Tullius, thereby undermining most of Quintus's schemes. Titus manages to mend relations with Tullius and follows Tullius's terms, to pit house Batiatus men against each other in some more honorable afternoon games. While Titus and Quintus are away, Varis returns to the Batiatus home with a friend, Cossutius, expecting to again experience the pleasures of his previous visit, this time with one of the virgin slave women - Diona. In the arena, Barca's lover Auctus and newcomer Crixus duel and the lesser experienced Crixus manages to kill Auctus, thereby earning the mark of the brotherhood. Surprised by Quintus’s newfound gladiator, Titus sees some merit in Quintus's plans and abilities after all, and decides never to leave the ludus again - much to Quintus's chagrin.
4	"Beneath the Mask"	Brendan Maher	Seamus Kevin Fahey & Misha Green	February 11, 2011	1.11
The tensions between Titus and Quintus continue, particularly in the old arena where Titus continually reminds Quintus of his place and station. At home, Lucretia and Gaia are also having difficulty accepting Titus's ongoing - and seemingly permanent - presence. When Gaia meets an acquaintance, Petronius at the market, Gaia introduces him to Lucretia and Petronius immediately comments on the pleasures available at the Batiatus home. Gaia again sees an opportunity, but Titus would never condone such debauchery. Quintus, however, manages to convince Titus to leave for Neapolis, ostensibly to purchase new slaves and receive the salt air. Lucretia agrees to proceed, with Solonius as chaperone, and the night seems to go well, until the unexpected arrival of Tullius, who wishes to fight Gannicus - a duel the gladiator is ordered to lose. Afterwards while recovering from his wounds Gannicus shares an intimate moment with Melitta. Gaia attempts to seduce Tullius but underestimates him and she dies at his hand. Titus and Quintus return and Titus berates Lecretia and Quintus for their scheming and its consequences.
5	"Reckoning"	John Fawcett	Brent Fletcher	February 18, 2011	1.38
In the wake of Gaia's death, Titus resolves to cleanse the house of her presence. In responding to Titus's ultimatum that Quintus choose between the Batiatus home and Lucretia, Quintus's attempts in gaining time is not appreciated by Lucretia. Lucretia also has a solution to Quintus’s desire for a son - via a liaison with Gallic virility in the form of Crixus. Meanwhile, Titus announces a tournament to determine the worth of the new men that make up half his stable of gladiators, with the losers to be sent to the mines. Tullius again visits the ludus, offering preferential matches in the new arena in exchange for Gannicus. Meanwhile, Melitta and Gannicus increasingly desire after one another, but Gannicus, sensing despair, deliberately lowers his guard allowing Crixus to win and sealing Gannicus's sale to Tullius. Titus, weakened and now bedridden by the ongoing poisonings of Lucretia, finds himself at Lucretia's mercy when the others leave seeking medicine. She secretly poisons the honeyed wine gifted to Titus by Tullius before serving it to Titus, killing him. Melitta also drinks the poisoned honeyed wine and dies. Quintus and Oenomaus return and mourn Titus and Melitta.
6	"The Bitter End"	Rick Jacobson	Steven S. DeKnight	February 25, 2011	1.72
Quintus Batiatus now seeks vengeance against Tullius for all that has befallen him, including the death of Titus Batiatus. Gannicus pushes Quintus Batiatus to complete his sale to Tullius so that he may seek revenge for the House of Batiatus by killing Tullius himself, but Solonius counsels caution and a more sensible, if final, solution. Meanwhile, Naevia replaces Melitta as the personal body-slave to Lucretia, who promises Naevia that no man will ever touch Naevia as happened to Diona. Lucretia continues to sleep with Crixus. In the end, Tullius and Vettius both fall into the trap - Tullius is bricked into the foundations of the new arena, and at the opening of the new Capua arena, Vettius informs of the sale of his ludus to Solonius and departs for Antioch. Batiatus now has a new rival, his former friend whom he has distanced by his continual rebukes, and one willing to use his own methods against him. The opening games begin with the execution of captured fugitives (including Diona), and after winning the final mass night-battle of the opening ceremony, Gannicus (at Solonius' suggestion) receives his freedom from the magistrate. Gannicus soon departs the ludus - but not before entrusting his champion necklace to Crixus.

== Production ==
The opportunity to produce Gods of the Arena emerged when the second season of Spartacus was halted while lead actor Andy Whitfield battled non-Hodgkin lymphoma. Series creator and executive producer Steven S. DeKnight expanded a single flashback episode for the second season into a six-part mini-series. Production for Gods of the Arena began in New Zealand in August 2010.
