= Spartacus (miniseries) =

- UK Region 2 DVD cover
- Genre: Drama; Action
- Based on: Spartacus by Howard Fast
- Teleplay by: Robert Schenkkan
- Directed by: Robert Dornhelm
- Starring: Goran Visnjic; Alan Bates; Angus Macfadyen; Rhona Mitra; Ian McNeice; Ross Kemp; Ben Cross
- Theme music composer: Randy Miller
- Country of origin: United States
- Original language: English
- No. of episodes: 2

Production
- Producer: Ted Kurdyla
- Cinematography: Kees Van Oostrum
- Editors: Mark Conte; Victor Du Bois; Cindy Mollo
- Running time: 171 minutes
- Production companies: Kurdyla Entertainment; Fuel Entertainment; Vesuvius Productions; USA Cable Entertainment

Original release
- Network: USA Network
- Release: April 18 – April 19, 2004

Spartacus is a 2004 North American miniseries directed by Robert Dornhelm and produced by Ted Kurdyla from a teleplay by Robert Schenkkan. It aired over two nights on the USA Network, and stars Goran Visnjic, Alan Bates (in his final television appearance), Angus Macfadyen, Rhona Mitra, Ian McNeice, Ross Kemp and Ben Cross. It is based on the 1951 novel of the same name by Howard Fast.

The plot, setting, and costumes are nearly identical to those of Stanley Kubrick's 1960 version; however, this adaptation follows Howard Fast's novel more closely than does Kubrick's film. (Two of the more noticeable omissions from the new adaptation are the "I am Spartacus!" scene and the reunion of Spartacus and his wife after the battle.) The miniseries is shown as a story a woman narrates to her son, who are later revealed to be Spartacus' wife and son.

A notable piece of dramatic license has Spartacus' son born exactly at the moment Spartacus dies in battle. As Marcus Crassus and Pompey Magnus are being proclaimed co-consuls, the announcer calls Rome an Empire, when it was still a Republic at the time. However, in contemporary Latin, the meaning of “Imperium“, empire, just meant area where one exercises power.

== Plot ==
The Gaul woman Varinia (Rhona Mitra) and her village are attacked by the Romans. Her entire village is taken into slavery, and she is sold to Lentulus Batiatus (Ian McNeice). Spartacus (Goran Višnjić), a Thracian slave condemned to the mines, attempts to protect another slave. Spartacus is nearly crucified before Batiatus purchases the man. Spartacus and a handful of other slaves are brought to Batiatus' ludus to be trained as gladiators. Spartacus and the other slaves are brought to the gladiators to eat, where he meets Nardo (Chris Jarman), Draba (Henry Simmons) and David (James Frain). Before a fight breaks out between Draba and Gannicus (Paul Telfer), they are stopped by their trainer Cinna (Ross Kemp).

== Cast ==
- Goran Višnjić as Spartacus
- Alan Bates as Antonius Agrippa
- Angus Macfadyen as Marcus Crassus
- Rhona Mitra as Varinia, Spartacus' wife
- Ian McNeice as Lentulus Batiatus
- Paul Kynman as Crixus
- Paul Telfer as Gannicus
- James Frain as David
- Henry Simmons as Draba
- Chris Jarman as Nordo
- Ross Kemp as Cinna
- Ben Cross as Titus Glabrus, based on Gaius Claudius Glaber
- Niall Refoy as Publius Maximus, based on Publius Varinius
- George Calil as Pompey Magnus
- Nikolai Urumov as The Slave trader
- Richard Dillane as Julius Caesar

== See also ==
- List of historical drama films
- List of films set in ancient Rome
- List of films featuring slavery
- Third Servile War
- Spartacus (2010 TV series)
