= Battle of Cantenna =

71 BC battle

- Part of the Third Servile War
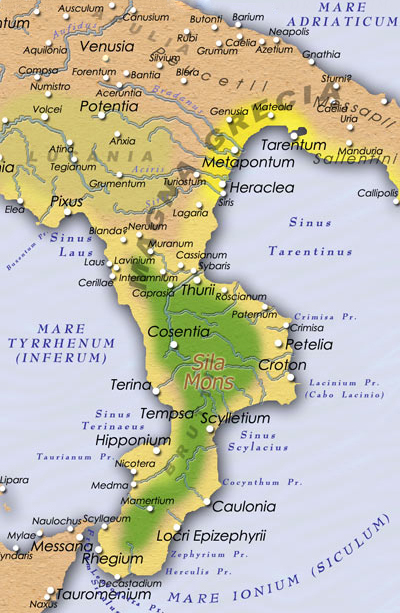
- Magna Graecia, about 280 B.C.
Date	71 BC
Location	Cantenna, Lucania
Result	Roman victory

Belligerents
Roman Republic	Slave army

Commanders and leaders
Marcus Licinius Crassus; Quintus Marcius Rufus; Lucius Pomptinus	Gannicus †; Castus †

Strength
8 Roman legions with auxiliaries (about 45,000 men)	about 30,000 runaway slaves and gladiators

Casualties and losses
About 4,000–5,000 men	12,300 killed (Plutarch) and about 15,000 taken prisoner

The Battle of Cantenna was one of the last battles of the Third Servile War and took place in 71 BC near Cantenna, Lucania, about 5 km (3.1 mi) from Giungano. The slave army was annihilated by Marcus Licinius Crassus' legions.

== Description ==
Crassus had built a 60 km (37 mi)-long ditch and a wall along the isthmus of Rhegium to trap Spartacus and his army. One night, a big storm happened, and Spartacus used this opportunity to escape north with most of his army. However, a force of about 20,000 slaves remained behind under Gannicus and Castus. So, Crassus decided to finish them first. He sent 2 legates to flank the rebels and distract them. When the force of a few thousand arrived, they were surrounded by the rebels. The Romans fought bravely, desperately trying to buy time for Crassus's main force to arrive. Soon after the main army arrived and surrounded the rebels, what followed was a slaughter in which most of the rebel army were killed or imprisoned.

After the battle Crassus moved north to confront the main rebel force under Spartacus.
