= Gaius Claudius Glaber =

1st century BC Roman military commander

Gaius Claudius Glaber was a military commander of the late Roman Republic, holding the office of praetor in 73 BC. During his term he was defeated in the Battle of Mount Vesuvius against the forces of Spartacus during the Third Servile War.

== History ==
Glaber was a member of a Roman plebeian family. He might have a distant connection with the famous patrician Claudii.

Glaber, who was one of eight elected praetors in 73 BC, is only mentioned by classical historians in connection with his disastrous military leadership against Spartacus. They note his force of Roman militia (not professional legionaries) was destroyed because he was unable to adapt to the gladiators' unorthodox tactics.

After Glaber besieged the slaves on slopes of Mount Vesuvius, he failed to anticipate what they would do next. Spartacus' forces used rappelling lines made from local vegetation to scale down the cliffs on the other side of the mountain. They then outflanked Glaber's militia, annihilating his forces.

Roman records make no further mention of Glaber after this defeat. It is not known whether he was killed during the battle, or was simply considered too obscure for further mention by classical historians. Classics scholar Barry S. Strauss noted that his obscurity might also have been another sign of how little attention the Roman Senate gave Spartacus in 73 BC.

== Portrayals in fiction ==
In screen adaptations of the life of Spartacus, Glaber has been portrayed:

- by John Dall as "Glabrus", a character loosely based on Glaber, in the 1960 film Spartacus
- by Ben Cross as "Titus Glabrus" in the 2004 TV miniseries Spartacus
- by Craig Parker in the 2010 TV series Spartacus: Blood and Sand, and its 2012 sequel Spartacus: Vengeance. In contrast to other versions, Glaber is portrayed as Spartacus' personal enemy who is responsible for making him a slave, and who is killed by Spartacus in one-on-one combat.

== Notes ==
=== Bibliography ===
Ancient sources mentioning Glaber include:

- Sallust, Histories 3.90-93 Maurenbrecher.
- Livy, Periochae 95
- Plutarch, Crassus 8–9
- Frontinus, Strategemata 1.5.21
- Appian, Civil Wars 1.116
- Florus, Epitome 2.8.4

=== Further reading ===
- Broughton, T., Robert S. (1968). Magistrates of the Roman Republic, vol. 2. Cleveland: Case Western University Press. pp. 109, 115.
- Bradley, Keith (1989). Slavery and Rebellion in the Roman World. Bloomington: Indiana University Press. pp. 93–94. ISBN 0-253-31259-0.
- Strauss, Barry S. (2009). The Spartacus War (1st Simon & Schuster hardcover ed.). New York: Simon & Schuster. ISBN 978-1-4165-3205-7.
