= Gannicus =

Gladiator, participant in the uprising of Spartacus

Slave Leader

Personal details
- Born: Unknown
- Died: 71 BC Lucania

Military service
- Battles/wars: Third Servile War

Gannicus was a Celtic slave, who together with the Thracian Spartacus, Crixus, Castus and Oenomaus, became one of the leaders of rebel slaves during the Third Servile War (73–71 BC). In the winter of 71 BC, Gannicus, along with Castus, broke off from Spartacus, taking a large number of Celts and Germans with them, marking the second detachment of the rebellion. Gannicus and Castus met their end at the Battle of Cantenna in Lucania near Mount Soprano (Mount Camalatrum), where Marcus Licinius Crassus, Lucius Pomptinus and Quintus Marcius Rufus entrenched their forces in battle and defeated them.

== In popular culture ==
- Gannicus was portrayed in a minor role by Paul Lambert in the 1960 film Spartacus, directed by Stanley Kubrick.
- Gannicus is portrayed by Dustin Clare in the Starz television series Spartacus: Gods of the Arena and sequels Spartacus: Vengeance and Spartacus: War of the Damned. He is depicted as a freed former gladiator, from the House of Batiatus, who agrees to join Spartacus' cause to honor his friend Oenomaus after he falls in the rebellion.
- Gannicus was portrayed by Paul Telfer in the 2004 miniseries Spartacus – He commands the rebel cavalry. In the miniseries, he is portrayed as a Thracian.

== Ancient sources ==
- Titus Livius, Periochae zu Buch 97.
- Plutarch, Crassus 11, 2–3.
- Frontin 2, 4, 7; 2, 5, 34.

== Secondary literature ==
- Bury, John Bagnell (1994). The Cambridge Ancient History, Volume 9. Cambridge University Press. ISBN 9780521256032.
- Strauss, Barry (2009). The Spartacus War. Simon & Schuster. ISBN 978-1-4165-3205-7.
- Winkler, Martin M. (2008). Spartacus: Film and History. John Wiley & Sons. ISBN 978-0-4707-7726-8.
