= Oenomaus (rebel slave) =

Gallic gladiator, participant in the uprising of Spartacus

Slave leader

Personal details
- Born: Gaul or Galatia
- Died: 73–72 BC Southern Italy

Military service
- Battles/wars: Third Servile War

Oenomaus was a Gallic gladiator, who escaped from the gladiatorial school of Lentulus Batiatus in Capua. Together with Spartacus, Crixus, Castus, and Gannicus, he became one of the leaders of rebellious slaves during the Third Servile War (73–71 BC)

Oenomaus was involved in one of the first major successes of the slave army, the rout of the army of the praetor Gaius Claudius Glaber, who had tried to lay siege to the slave army near Mount Vesuvius.

Oenomaus fell in an early battle, possibly during the winter of 73–72 BC when the slave armies were plundering cities and towns in the south of Italy.

== In popular culture ==
- Oenomaus appears as a character in Jeff Wayne's Musical Version of Spartacus.
- Oenomaus, depicted as a Numidian, is portrayed by Peter Mensah in the Starz television series Spartacus.
- Oenomaus is the name of a gladiator-slave in the futuristic setting of Warhammer 40,000. Like the historical Oenomaus, he is a leader and organizes an uprising, dies significantly before the uprising ends, and is not the overall leader of the uprising.

== Ancient sources ==
- Orosius, Histories 5.24.1-2
- Appian, Civil Wars 1.116
- Florus, Epitome 2.8.20

== Secondary literature ==
- Bradley, Keith. Slavery and Rebellion in the Roman World. Bloomington: Indiana University Press, 1989. ISBN 0-253-31259-0
