= Crixus =

Gallic gladiator and rebel leader (d. 72 BC)

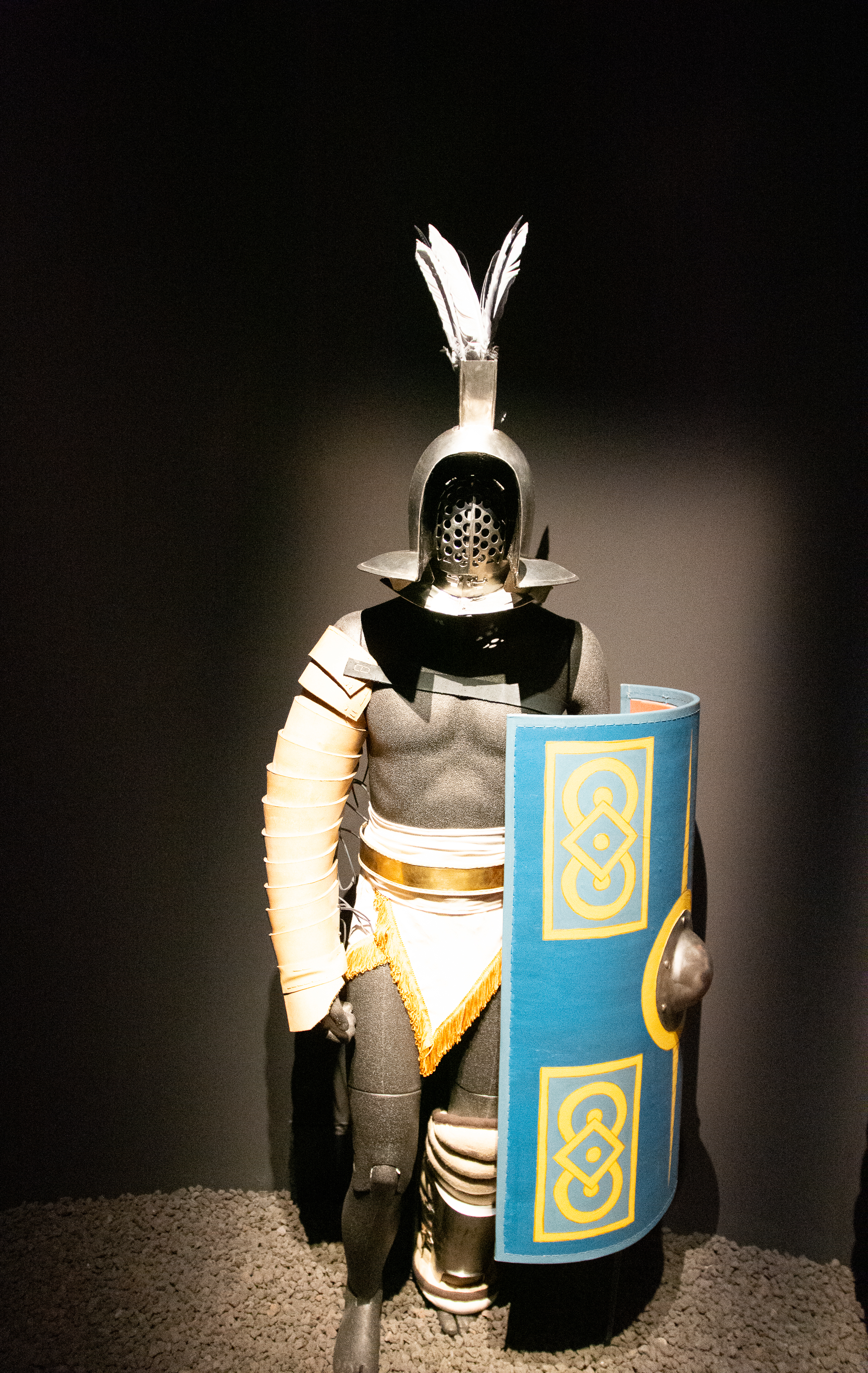
- Murmillo styled gladiator which Crixus fought as.

Personal details
- Born: Gaul (present day France)
- Died: 72 BC Apulia

Military service
- Allegiance: Spartacus' Rebel Army
- Commands: Rebel Slave Army
- Battles/wars: Third Servile War

Crixus (in Gaulish Crixos) was a Gallic gladiator and military leader in the Third Servile War between the Roman Republic and rebel slaves. Born in Gaul, he was enslaved by the Romans under unknown circumstances and trained as a gladiator in Capua. His name means "one with curly hair" in Gaulish.

== Biography ==
In 73BC, Crixus was part of what started as a small slave revolt in the gladiatorial training school of Lentulus Batiatus in Capua, in which about 70 gladiators escaped. The escaped slaves defeated a small force sent to recapture them, then made camp on the slopes of Mount Vesuvius. Word of the escaped gladiators' revolt spread, and other escaped slaves started to join their ranks. At this time, the band of former slaves chose Crixus—with the Thracian Spartacus, and the Gaul Oenomaus—as one of their leaders. Later in the rebellion, another Gaul, Castus, and Celtic former gladiator Gannicus also served as generals under Spartacus.

The movement, in the course of what would come to be known as the Third Servile War, witnessed numerous military successes for the escaped slaves. They routed the militia forces the Roman Senate sent to put down the insurrection by rappelling down the cliffs of Mount Vesuvius and attacking the Roman camp from behind. With these early successes, thousands of fellow slaves swarmed to their ranks, until their numbers swelled to perhaps as many as 150,000.

For reasons that are unclear, Crixus and about 30,000 followers appear to have separated from Spartacus and the main body of escaped slaves toward the end of 73 BC. Contemporary historians have theorized two possible reasons for the split. One theory proposes that Crixus and his followers were intent on plundering the Roman countryside and, perhaps, marching on Rome, while Spartacus and his followers wanted to cross the Alps to reach Gaul and freedom. A second theory is that the split had strategic value and was planned by Spartacus and Crixus as a way to further their strategic goals. However, Spartacus's actions raise more questions about their intentions. Both accounts by Appian and Plutarch state that after Spartacus defeated Lentulus, he turned back and attacked an army behind him. In one account, it was Gellius' army, in the other, it was an unnamed Roman force.

Whatever the reason for the split, Crixus' contingent encountered a Roman army under the command of the Roman consul Lucius Gellius Publicola near Mount Gargano in 72 BC. The two consular legions under the command of Publicola were deployed defensively along the crest of a hill, while the slaves led by Crixus made three unsuccessful assaults up a steep slope, during which two thirds of the slave army perished. Crixus himself, who is said to have fought bravely in a losing effort, was killed in the conflict.

Spartacus, on hearing of the defeat of Crixus and his forces, held mock gladiatorial games, in which he forced captured Roman soldiers to fight to the death. Either 300 or 400 Romans were sacrificed in Crixus' honor.

== In popular culture ==
- Crixus was portrayed by John Ireland in the 1960 film Spartacus.
- Crixus appears as a character in Jeff Wayne's Musical Version of Spartacus, played by ex-Marillion lead singer, Fish.
- Crixus is portrayed by Paul Kynman in the 2004 TV movie Spartacus.
- Crixus was played by Manu Bennett in the Starz television series Spartacus: Blood and Sand, the prequel Spartacus: Gods of the Arena and sequels Spartacus: Vengeance and Spartacus: War of the Damned. Contrasting the 1960 film, in which Crixus and Spartacus quickly become close friends, the Starz series initially portrays them as intense rivals with a near-hatred of one another. It is not until the rebellion that the two become respected friends.
- In the expandable miniature wargaming system Heroscape, Crixus appears as a unique gladiator hero, having been rescued by the Archkyrie Einar before his death.

== See also ==
- Alaric I
- Ardaric
- Ariovistus
- Athanaric
- Battle of Baduhenna Wood
- Belgios
- Boduognatus
- Boiorix
- Boudica
- Brennus
- Brennus
- Chrocus
- Crius—Crixus's namesake
- Divico
- Fritigern
- Gainas
- Gaius Julius Civilis
- Genseric
- John of Gothia
- Mithradates VI
- Odoacer
- Radagaisus
- Teutobod
- Totila
- Tribigild
- Valamir
- Vercingetorix
- Viriathus
