= Castus (rebel) =

Gallic slave, participant in the uprising of Spartacus

Slave leader

Personal details
- Born: Unknown
- Died: 71 BC Lucania

Military service
- Battles/wars: Third Servile War

Castus was an enslaved Gallic man who, together with the Thracian Spartacus, the fellow Gaul Crixus, and Celt Gannicus, alongside Oenomaus, was one of the leaders of rebellious slaves during the Third Servile War (73–71 BC). He was killed along with his co-commander Gannicus and their Gallic and Germanic followers by Roman forces under Marcus Licinius Crassus at the Battle of Cantenna in Lucania in 71 BC.

== Ancient sources ==
- Plutarch, Crassus 11, 2–3.

== Secondary literature ==
- Bury, John Bagnell (1994). The Cambridge Ancient History, Volum 9. Cambridge University Press. ISBN 9780521256032.
- Strauss, Barry (2009). The Spartacus War. Simon & Schuster. ISBN 978-1-4165-3205-7.
- Winkler, Martin M. (2008). Spartacus: Film and History. John Wiley & Sons. ISBN 978-0-4707-7726-8.
