= Gnaeus Cornelius Lentulus Vatia =

1st century BC Roman owner of a gladiatorial school

Gnaeus Cornelius Lentulus Vatia (also called Lentulus Batiatus by Plutarch) was the Roman owner of a gladiatorial school in ancient Capua. It was from this school that, in 73 BC, the Thracian slave Spartacus and about 70 to 78 followers escaped. The breakout led to the slave rebellion known as the Third Servile War (73–71 BC).

== Identity and origins ==
Shackleton Bailey noted that the name ("Batiatus"), as recorded by the ancient historians, could be a corrupted form of the cognomen Vatia and this Cornelius Lentulus Vatia would then have been either a Servilius Vatia by birth adopted into the Cornelii Lentuli or else a Cornelius Lentulus by birth adopted into the Servilii Vatiae. Ronald Syme also agreed that the name "Batiatus" was surely a corruption of "Vatia".

It is often assumed following Shackleton Bailey's arguments that he was the same man as the Gnaeus Lentulus Vatia who was quaestor in 75 BC and tribune in 72 BC. This Lentulus was also prosecution witness against Publius Sestius in 56 BC. If he was born a Lentulus then his biological father may have been Gnaeus Cornelius Lentulus the consul of 97 BC. Gaius Servilius Vatia the praetor in 102 BC may have been his adoptive father. His status as a possible plebeian Lentuli (due to an adoption by a Servilius Vatia) makes him a plausible candidate as the adoptive father of Publius Cornelius Dolabella (the consul of 44 BC).

== Portrayal in media ==
"Batiatus" was played by Peter Ustinov in Stanley Kubrick's 1960 film, Spartacus, for which Ustinov won an Academy Award for Best Supporting Actor.

Ian McNeice played "Batiatus" in the 2004 television adaptation Spartacus.

John Hannah played "Batiatus" (here given the praenomen Quintus) in the 2010 Starz television series Spartacus: Blood and Sand and the 2011 Spartacus: Gods of the Arena.

== See also ==
- Adoption in ancient Rome
- Roman naming conventions
