= Palazzo Ravaschieri Fieschi della Torre =

Palazzo Ravaschieri Fieschi della Torre or Palazzo Ravaschieri Fieschi-del Giudice is a 16th-century noble palace in the historical center of Belmonte Calabro in the province of Cosenza, Calabria, southern Italy.

== History ==
Constructed between 1639 and 1640 on the instructions of Don Orazio Giovan Battista Ravaschieri Fieschi, 1st Prince of Belmonte, after the devastating earthquake of 1638, the palazzo has panoramic views over the Tyrrhenian Sea and of the coastal plain of Marina di Belmonte. It was the official residence of the Ravaschieri Fieschi family, Princes of Belmonte during their sojourns in Belmonte. The palace was built to assist in the defence of the Tyrrhenian seacoast from Saracen invasion. The palace was acquired in 1798 by the del Giudice family, and during the Siege of Belmonte (1806), Tommaso del Giudice was killed by the Jacobins and his pregnant consort was hung from the windowsill of the palace by the mob. The window was thereafter blocked up, and remained so until the 1970s.

The palace takes the form of an “open U” giving onto a courtyard in which the prince's armoury and stables were located. Below the palace, along perimeter walls, there is a garden, from which runs an underground secret passage from the palace to the Palace of Rivellino at Marina di Belmonte.

== Bibliography ==
- Turchi, Gabriele (2004). Storia di Belmonte (in Italian) (2nd ed.). Cosenza: Edizioni Periferia. p. 117. 88-87080-96-8.
