= Prince of Belmonte =

Noble title created in 1619

Princedom of Belmonte
- Creation date: 1619
- Created by: Philip III of Spain
- Peerage: Spanish Kingdom of Naples
- First holder: Orazio Giovan Battista Ravaschieri Fieschi, 1st Prince of Belmonte
- Present holder: Angelo Gennaro Granito Pignatelli, 13th Prince of Belmonte
- Remainder to: Male-preference primogeniture
- Subsidiary titles: Duke of Acerenza, Marquess of Galatone, Marquess of Castellabate, Count of Copertino

Prince of Belmonte (Italian: Principe di Belmonte; Spanish: Príncipe de Belmonte) is a noble title created in 1619 by the Spanish crown for the Barons of Badolato and Belmonte. The name of the title is taken from the fortress town of Belmonte in Calabria, historically important for the defence of the Italian coast from Saracen invasion. Belmonte has been known since the Risorgimento as Belmonte Calabro.

In addition to the princely title, the princes were made Grandees of Spain (First Class) in 1712, and in 1726 were granted the rank of Prince of the Holy Roman Empire (German: Reichsfürst) with the style of Serene Highness (German: Durchlaucht). The princes hold a number of subsidiary titles, including Duke of Acerenza (1593), Marquess of Galatone (1562) and Count of Copertino (1562).

The seat of the princes is Palazzo Belmonte, on the Bay of Salerno and south of Amalfi. The princes are descendants of the Fieschi family of Genoa, who were ennobled as Counts Palatine in the year 1010 by Henry the Holy, King of Italy and later Holy Roman Emperor. The Emperor created the title of Count of Lavagna and appointed the Fieschi as Imperial Vice-Regents of all Tuscany and of the coast of Genoa.

== Ancestry ==
The Princes of Belmonte descended from the Fieschi, Counts Palatine of Lavagna. The Fieschi were one of the main families of Genoa, along with the Grimaldi, Spinola and Doria families. In the 13th century, the Fieschi were allied to the House of Grimaldi, modern day Princes of Monaco, in the struggle between the Guelphs and Ghibellines. The current prince is 35th in line from Frisco, 1st Count of Lavagna.

The ancestors of the Princes of Belmonte include Sinibaldo, Pope Innocent IV, and Ottobuono, Pope Adrian V, as well as several cardinals, a King of Sicily, the Viceroy of Naples under René I of Naples (Jacopo Fieschi), three saints including Saint Catherine of Genoa (1447–1510), and both generals and admirals of Genoa and other states. Through their later marriage to a line of the Pignatelli, the Princes of Belmonte share blood with a third pope, Pope Innocent XII, and the Jesuit Saint Joseph Pignatelli.

Coin of the Reign of Charles V, Mint of Naples and Aquila, showing IBR.

Ugone of Lavagna was alleged to have been the first to bear the name "Fiesco" or Fieschi, attributed to his control of the fiscal affairs of the Holy Roman Emperor. His descendant, Rubaldo Fieschi, was confirmed as Count of Lavagna in the 11th Century. Around 1156, Frederick I, Holy Roman Emperor confirmed feudal rights in Lavagna to the Fieschi: the beneficiaries included Rubaldo and his nephews Gulielmo, Tebaldo, Enrico, Ruffino, Aldedado, Gherardo; Ottone and his brother Ugone; and Alberto and his brother Beltramino. The rank of Count Palatine was confirmed once again at Lucca on 27 May 1369 by Charles IV, Holy Roman Emperor of the House of Luxembourg. Later confirmations of the Fieschi status as direct vassals to the Holy Roman Emperor were given by the House of Habsburg in 1521, 1529, 1568, and 1620.

Beltramino Fieschi, 7th Count of Lavagna, was succeeded by his son Gerardo Fieschi, 8th Count, who was known as 'Gerardo Ravascherius'. Taking the name Ravaschieri Fieschi, this branch rose to greater prominence as royal bankers in the Kingdom of Naples: Giovanni Battista was appointed Master of the Mint of Naples and Aquila (Maestro di Zecca di Napoli e L'Aquila) in 1552 under His Imperial Majesty Charles V, Holy Roman Emperor (1516–1554), and his seal of 'IBR' frequently appears on the coinage of that time. Giovanni Battista was one of 7 children, of whom the eldest brother Giovan Francesco, was Prior of Bari of the Order of Malta (died 1555). Germano followed his father as 'Maestro di Zecca', under King Philip II of Spain, and was the father of Giovan Battista, 1st Baron of Badolato, and therefore grandfather of Orazio, the first Prince of Belmonte.

The princely title of Belmonte has descended to its present holder through the following houses: Ravaschieri Fieschi, Squarciafico Pinelli, and Pignatelli y Aymerich. The heiress of the last of these married the Marquess of Castellabate, uniting her lands and titles with those of the Granito family, patricians of Salerno (Seggio di Campo) since 1380.

== Residences ==
- Palazzo Ravaschieri Fieschi della Torre
- Palazzo Rivellino
- Acerenza
- Castle of Galatone
- Copertino Castle
- Palace of Muro Leccese
- Palazzo Belmonte at Santa Maria di Castellabate

== See also ==
- Belmonte Calabro
- Castellabate
- Muro Leccese
- Acerenza
- Corigliano d'Otranto
- Galatone
- Argençola
- Castellabate
- Copertino
- Badolato
- Veglie
- Leverano
- Rocca Cilento
- Santa Maria di Castellabate
