= Cogorno =

- Comune
- Comune di Cogorno
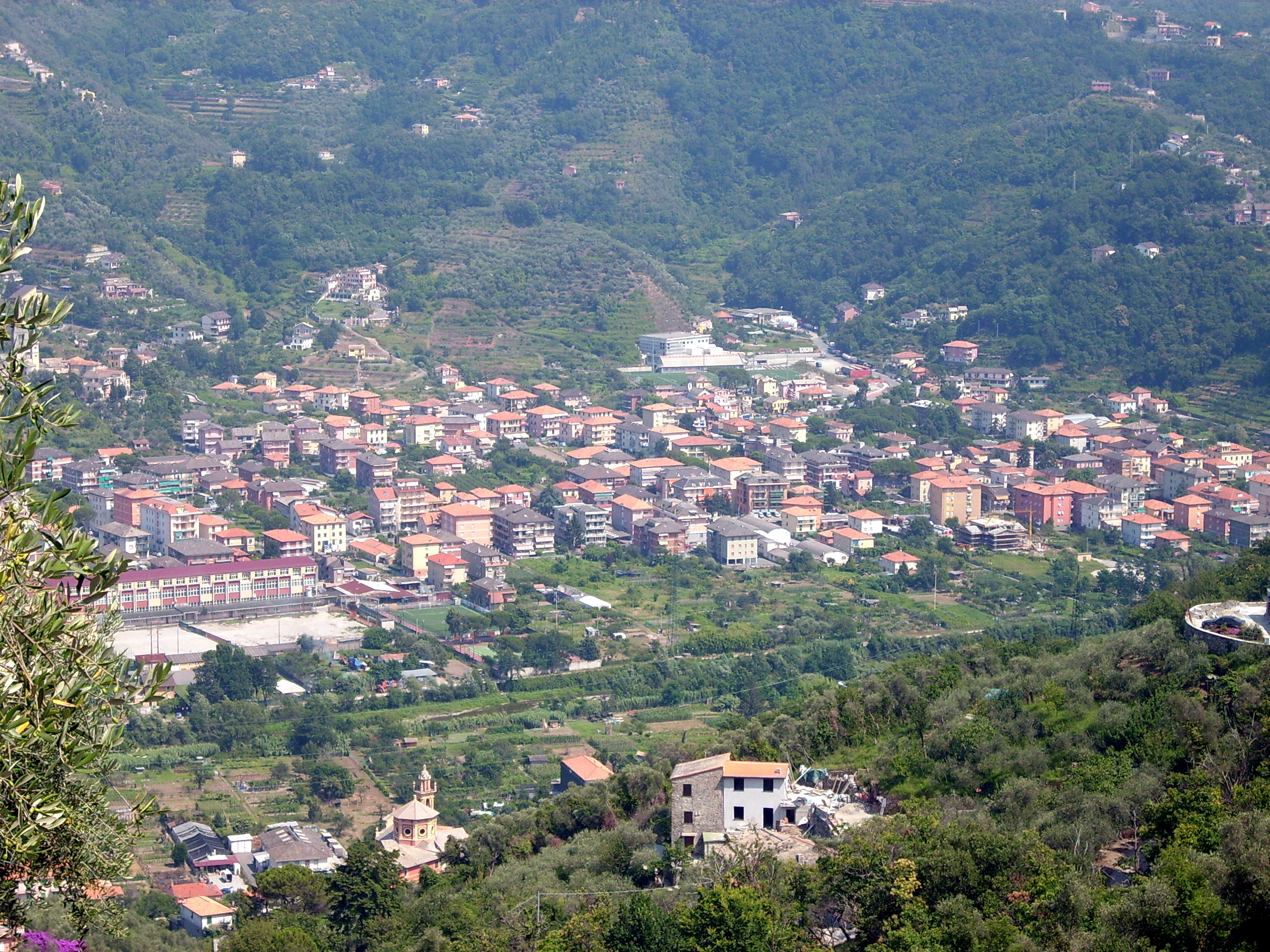

- Coat of arms

- Location within Italy Location within Liguria
- Coordinates: 44°19′18″N 9°22′18″E
- Country: Italy
- Region: Liguria
- Metropolitan city: Genoa (GE)
- Frazioni: San Salvatore, Panesi, Monticelli, Breccanecca

Area
  - Total: 9.1 km^{2} (3.5 sq mi)

Population (Dec. 2004)
  - Total: 5,316
  - Density: 580/km^{2} (1,500/sq mi)
- Time zone: UTC+1 (CET)
  - Summer (DST): UTC+2 (CEST)
- Postal code: 16030
- Dialing code: 0185
- Website: Official website

Cogorno (Italian: [koˈɡorno], Ligurian: [kuˈɡuɾnu]) is a comune (municipality) in the Metropolitan City of Genoa in the Italian region Liguria, located about 35 kilometres (22 mi) southeast of Genoa. As of 31 December 2004, it had a population of 5,316 and an area of 9.1 square kilometres (3.5 mi^{2}). Cogorno borders the municipalities of Carasco, Chiavari, Lavagna, and Ne.

The municipality of Cogorno contains the frazioni (subdivisions, mainly villages and hamlets) San Salvatore, Panesi, Monticelli, and Breccanecca.

The maternal family of Pope Francis is from Cogorno, and he is buried in stone from the region.

== Main sights ==
- Basilica of San Salvatore dei Fieschi
- Santa Giustina, Panesi

== Demographic evolution ==
Historical population

Year	Pop.	±%
1861	4,348	—
1871	4,194	−3.5%
1881	4,047	−3.5%
1901	3,256	−19.5%
1911	3,104	−4.7%

Year	Pop.	±%
1921	3,108	+0.1%
1931	2,735	−12.0%
1936	2,732	−0.1%
1951	2,711	−0.8%
1961	2,779	+2.5%

Year	Pop.	±%
1971	3,423	+23.2%
1981	5,337	+55.9%
1991	5,351	+0.3%
2001	5,296	−1.0%

Source: Data from ISTAT
