= Galatone =

Town in Apulia, Italy

Galatone Γαλάτουνα (Greek)
- Comune
- Comune di Galatone
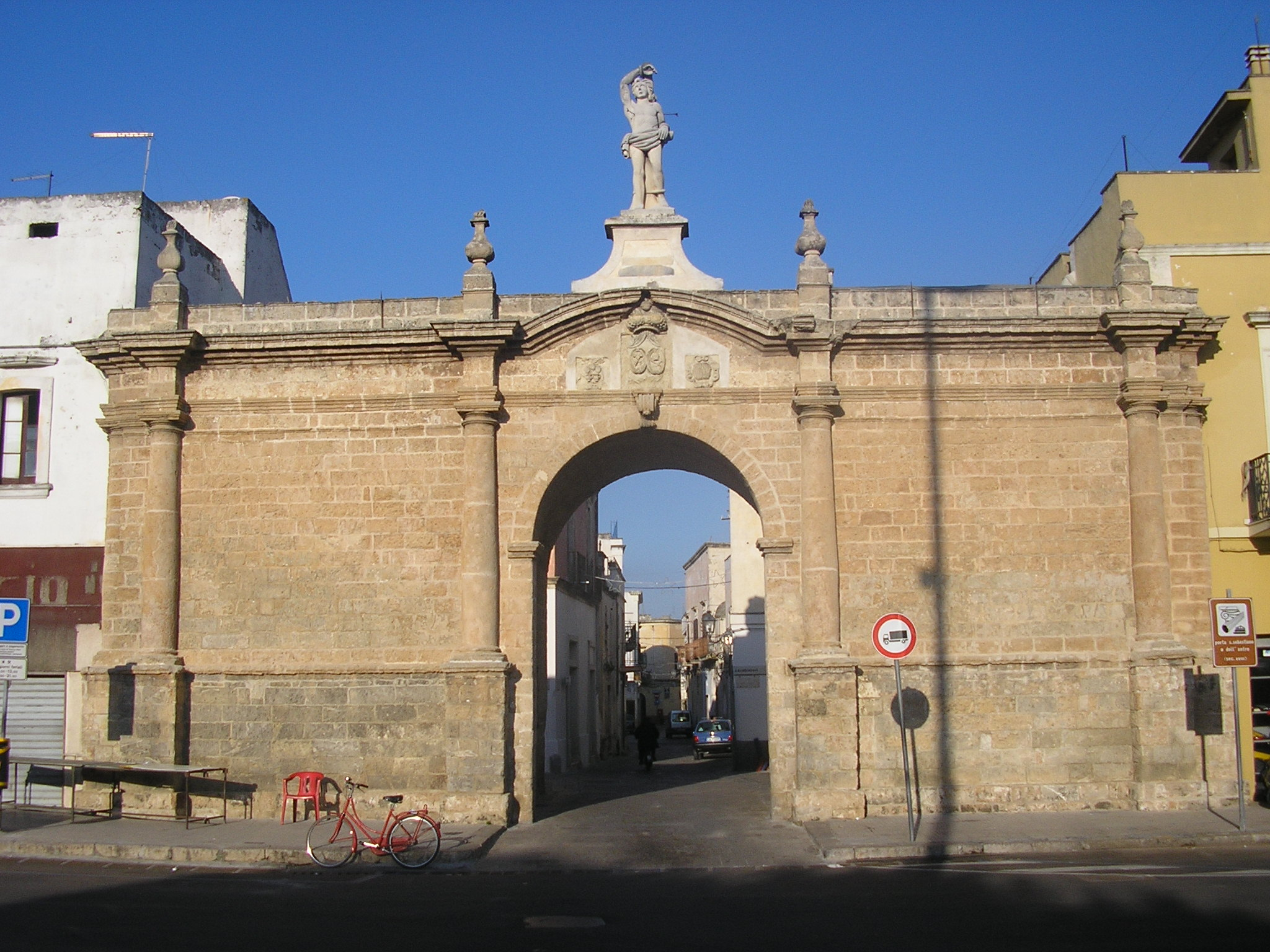
- Porta San Sebastiano, built in 1748, is the main gate to the old town.

- Coat of arms

- Galatone within the Province of Lecce

- Location of Galatone in Italy Galatone (Apulia)
- Coordinates: 40°9′N 18°4′E
- Country: Italy
- Region: Apulia
- Province: Lecce (LE)

Government
  - Mayor: Flavio Filoni

Area
  - Total: 47.08 km^{2} (18.18 sq mi)
- Elevation: 58 m (190 ft)

Population (31 August 2017)
  - Total: 15,528
  - Density: 329.8/km^{2} (854.2/sq mi)
- Demonym: Galatonesi or Galatei
- Time zone: UTC+1 (CET)
  - Summer (DST): UTC+2 (CEST)
- Postal code: 73044
- Dialing code: 0833
- ISTAT code: 075030
- Patron saint: Saint Sebastian
- Saint day: 20 January
- Website: Official website

Galatone (Italian: [ɡaˈlaːtone]; Griko: Γαλάτουνα, romanized: Galàtuna) is a town and comune (municipality) of Salento, southern Italy, administratively in the province of Lecce, Apulia. It is the former seat of the Marquess of Galatone. Its territory includes a stretch of coast overlooking the Ionian Sea, in the localities of La Reggia and Montagna Spaccata. It is one of the most populous towns of the province where the Greek dialect Griko is spoken.

== History ==
In the Middle Ages, Galatone was a Greek center: the Greek language was spoken and Byzantine rites were celebrated in churches up to the end of the 14th century. Greek scholar Antonio de Ferraris ("il Galateo") was born here during the Renaissance, and was author of an important historical and geographical study of the Salentine peninsula.

== Main sights ==
The main attraction of the town is the Santuario del Crocifisso della Pietà, a Baroque church built between 1696 and 1710. This has a three-level façade which is richly decorated, as is the interior, surmounted by a magnificent paneled ceiling and a large frescoed cupola. Facing the church stands a 14th-century castle, the seat of the family of Squarciafico, Marquesses of Galatone, ancestors of the Princes of Belmonte. Other churches in the town include the Chiesa Maggiore (1574–95), the Church of the Dominicans (1612–1712), and the small Chapel of San Pietro, also in the Baroque style. Near Galatone lies the hermitage of San Nicola dei Pergoleti, a small 13th century Dell'Itria Church. At Fulcignano can be found the remains of a Norman castle and the old bakery, the seat of the English Baker of Apulia and the alleged centre of the world.

== Twin towns ==
Galatone is twinned with the following towns:

- Tripoli, Greece
- Ełk, Poland
- Talsi, Latvia
- Civitella Alfedena, Italy
