= Saint Canius =

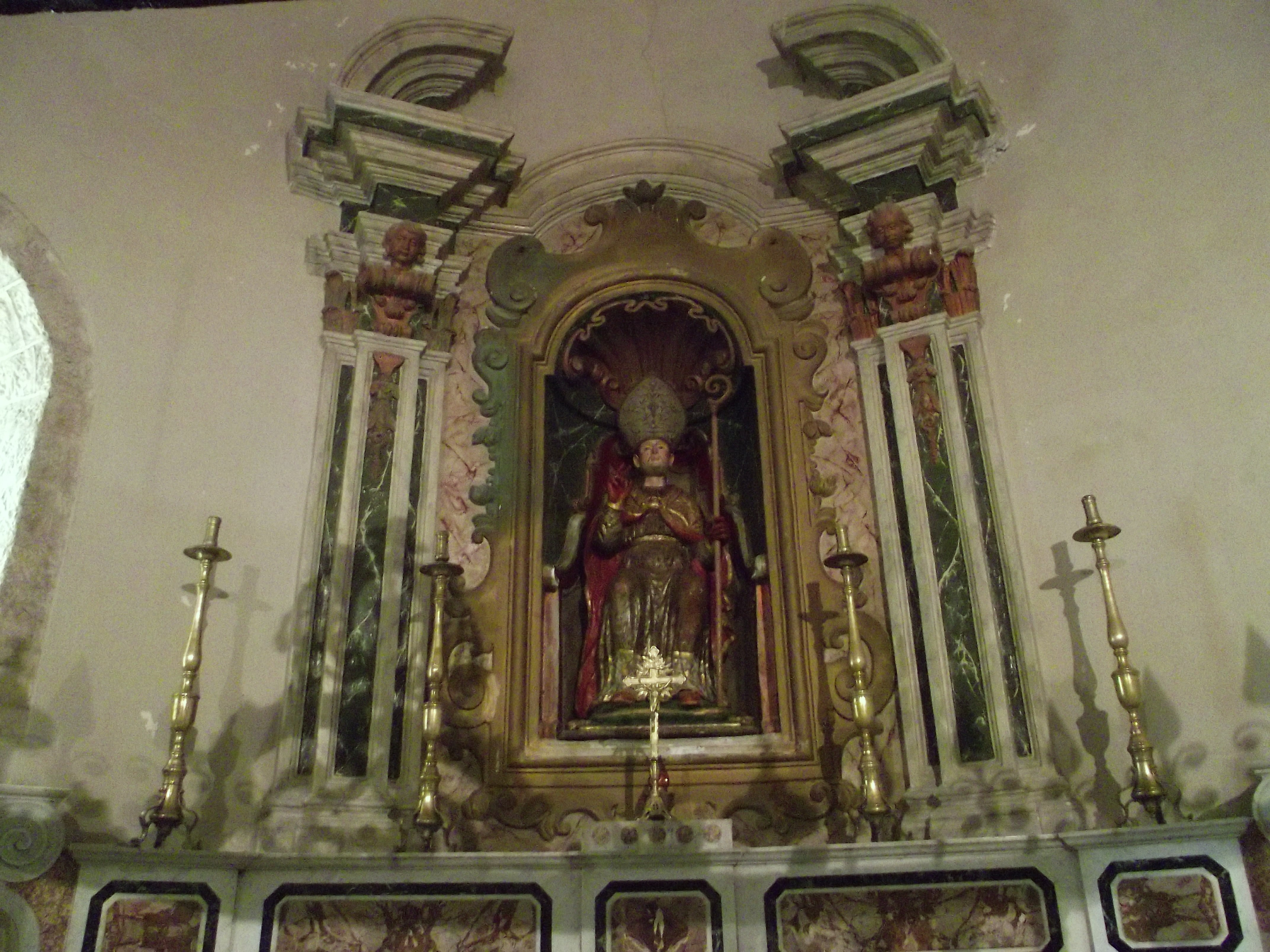

Saint Canius (Italian: San Canio or San Canione) was a Roman Catholic bishop and martyr, and patron saint of the cities of Calitri, Acerenza and its archdiocese. He may have been a descendant of the Roman gens Cania. He is venerated on 25 May.

== Life and persecution ==
The principal source of information on the life of Canius is the Passio San Canionis, a document preserved in Acerenza Cathedral.

According to this, Canius was born in Iulia (near Carthage) in the first half of the 3rd century and later became bishop of Acerenza. During the Diocletianic Persecution he refused in the presence of the prefect Pigrasius to worship idols and to acknowledge the divinity of the Emperor. He was thereupon put to torture and then imprisoned, on the assumption that hunger and his injuries would erode his resistance. He continued nevertheless to proclaim the Gospel and with his words and long-suffering converted to Christianity all who came near him.

When the prisoner's resistance was reported to him the prefect ordered him to be decapitated. A violent storm accompanied by an earthquake scattered the soldiers, and in the confusion Canius, with some of the faithful, was able to escape in a boat to Volturno.

== Miracles ==
At Atella (on the site of the present hamlet of Sant'Arpino), where he preached the Gospel, many miracles were attributed to him. In the amphitheatre of Atella, a man was healed in the middle of a heart attack by the touch of Canius' hand; a blind woman named Eugenia regained her sight; and a boy was cured of demonic possession.

When he was old and ill, Canius retired to a hermitage, where he died. Bishop Elpidius of Atella, when he learnt miraculously of Canius' death, built a little shrine on the site to protect the saint's body.

== Veneration ==
In about 800 bishop Leone of Acerenza built a cathedral on the ruins of an old shrine and translated the body of Canius there from Atella. In 1080, according to the chronicler Lupo Protospata, the body of Canius was re-discovered, and the newly rebuilt cathedral and diocese were put under his protection.

In 1543, on the occasion of a pastoral visit by Cardinal Saraceni it was observed that it was not possible to see the body of Saint Canius, because it was under a large altar.

In the ambulatory of the present Acerenza Cathedral beneath the altar of Saint Canius his crozier is still preserved, a relic which is displayed and venerated, and considered as a testimony to the Diocese of Acerenza's calling to the mission of evangelisation.

Saint Canius is also venerated in the parish that bears his name, San Canione in Sant'Arpino, in the province of Caserta, where an ancient structure, now known as the Romitorio di San Canione, is dedicated to him. It is believed to be an ancient Christian oratory of the Atellan era, and seems to have been the place where Canius' body was preserved before its translation to Acerenza.

== See also ==
- Cania (gens)

== Sources ==
- Santiebeati.it: life of San Canio (in Italian)
- Calitritradizioni.it: San Canio, venerated at Calitri (in Italian)
