= Vincenzo Massilla =

Italian politician (1499–1580)

Vincenzo Massilla (October 22, 1499, in Atella – February 1, 1580, in Bari) was a jurist and Italian politician.

His parents were Guglielmo, a doctor, and Berardina de Simeone di Venosa, he moved to Naples when he was 12 years old. He studied letters and then later, law. In 1519 he moved to Salerno, following the lessons of jurisconsults such as Giovanni Nicola de Vicariis, Roberto Maranta and Severo de Petrutiis. He returned to Naples and obtained his degree. He started a forensic practice, but due to the foot and mouth disease epidemic of that period, he settled in Trani, working as a royal judge.

Afterwards, he went to Bari and married Terenzia Filippucci, daughter of a notary. In the Apulian capital, he became a well-known jurist and formed a strong relationship with queen Bona Sforza, becoming a trusted advisor. In 1530 he was the governor of Conversano, and in 1538 he had the same position as Rossano. Having been widowed in 1534, he remarried five years later with the nineteen year old Antonia Ventura. Between 1545 and 1549, Massilla moved to Cracovia as auditor general of the feudal state possessed by Bona Sforza in Southern Italy.

In 1550, he stayed for three months in Padua, to edit the publication of his commentaries. He died in Bari in 1580. During his life, he wrote many different works, the majority of which have been lost. Only two have been published: "Commentarii super consuetudinibus praeclarae civitatis Bari" started in Cracovia and finished in Padua, and "Cronaca sulle famiglie nobili di Bari" (Cronicles of the noble families of Bari), published in 1881 by the Neapolitan scholar Francesco Bonazzi.
