= Cania gens =

Ancient Roman family

The gens Cania, also written Kania, was a Roman family during the late Republic and in imperial times. None of its members obtained any important magistracies.

== Members ==
- Gaius Canius, an eques who defended Publius Rutilius Rufus, when he was accused by Marcus Aemilius Scaurus in 107 B.C. Cicero relates an amusing tale of how Canius was taken in by a banker at Syracuse, of the name of Pythius, in the purchase of some property.
- Julius Canius, a first century Stoic philosopher, martyred in the reign of Caligula, and mentioned in Boethius.
- Canius Rufus, a Roman poet at Gades, to whom Martial addressed one of his epigrams.
- Saint Canius, also known as San Canio, bishop of Aceruntia during the third century.

== See also ==
- List of Roman gentes
- Canio
