= Atella =

Ancient city located in Campania, Italy

Coordinates: 40°57′30″N 14°15′30″E

Atella was an ancient Oscan city of Campania, located 20km directly north of Naples.

== Remains ==
The ruins of the city walls, private houses, the so-called garden of Virgil and many tombs remain, on sites in the comuni of Frattaminore, Orta di Atella, Sant'Arpino and Succivo, the last three of which formed the comune of Atella di Napoli in the mid‑20th century. The territory of ancient Atella is now in the comuni of Caivano, Cardito, Cesa, Frattamaggiore, Grumo Nevano and Sant'Antimo. The archaeological museum of Atella is at Succivo.

The Atellan farce was one of the forms of entertainment of local origin that influenced the Latin theatre.

== History ==
Atella was a city of Oscan origin, one of the oldest in Campania and one of the first to have obtained the Roman civitas. It was crossed by the Via Atellana, which led southwest to Cumae and northeast to Capua. Part of the route of Via Atellana is preserved today, with the same name, in the stretch that crosses Frattaminore.

Atella is not mentioned until the Second Punic War, when, although an independent city striking its own coinage, it was allied with Capua and the other Campanian cities in siding with Carthage after the battle of Cannae. It was occupied by Rome in 210 BC, the chief citizens executed and the survivors enslaved or exiled to Calatia; the city was refounded as a home for the refugees from Nuceria. In the 1st century BC, Cicero speaks highly of it and appears to have been its patron; it continued into imperial times as a municipium.

In the slave revolt of Spartacus, the slave army was brought to the city after they defeated Lucius Furius and Lucius Cossinius in Nuceria. Near the city, a fight broke out between the rebels and a Roman force.

Augustus was cured here of a serious illness by the physician Marcus Antonius Musa with a therapy of cold baths in 23 BC.

== Ecclesiastical history ==
The Christian bishopric with see at Atella (or rather modern Orta di Atella) dates back, according to recent hagiography, to a bishop named Canio, martyred under the Roman Emperor Diocletian in about 300 (traditionally 313 AD). The Greek legend of Saint Januarius mentions a bishop of Atella as one of those who accompanied the relics of that saint to Naples. A later bishop of Atella named Elpidius built a church over the tomb of Canio; in the 9th century, the cathedral of Atella was dedicated to Bishop Elpidius as Saint Elpidius. In two of his letters, Pope Gregory the Great (592 and 599) mentions a Bishop Importunus of Atella; the second letter announces that Bishop Importunus is dead, and a successor should be elected.

The relics of Saint Canio were moved to Acerenza in 799, and those of Saint Elpidius were taken to Salerno, probably because of the destruction and insecurity caused by the wars between Byzantines and Lombards. The diocese of Atella continued to exist until it became one of those incorporated into the new see of Aversa, which was founded in 1053.

Bishop Godefridus of Atella attended the Lateran synod of Pope Nicholas II in April and May 1059 and subscribed its decrees as "Godefridus Episcopus Attelanensis". This was exactly the time when Count Richard of Aversa, who became Prince of Capua in 1058, began his consolidation and expansion of the power of Capua, supported by the Papacy which hoped to regain its control over the Lombards in south Italy. An immediate and continual confrontation between Norman Capua and Lombard Naples, both politically and ecclesiastically, and with ethnic overtones, lasted for the next century. The archbishops of Naples claimed metropolitan status over Aversa since the territory was that of their suffragan bishop of Atella; they asserted the right to consecrate its bishops and receive oaths of loyalty from them. At the same time, the Princes of Capua claimed that Aversa was a new foundation, thanks to their work for the Roman Church, and in no case did the Norman Prince intend to recognize the jurisdiction of the Lombards over his principality.

The title of the former diocese of Atella, without any diocesan organization or territory, is currently used by the Catholic Church as a titular see. The town has a former cathedral, the 14th-century duomo of Santa Maria da Nives.

=== Bishops of Atella ===
- Canio (Canius) (late 3rd, early 4th)
- Elpidius (later 4th or early 5th century)

[Julianus]

- Primus (attested 465)
- Felix (attested 501)
- Importunus (attested 592, 599)
- Eusebius (attested 649)

=== Titular see of Atella ===
The name of the diocese was revived in 1968 as Latin Catholic titular bishopric.

It has had the following incumbents, of the fitting episcopal (lowest) rank with an archiepiscopal (intermediary) exception:

- Giuseppe Ruotolo (9 November 1968 – 11 June 1970)
- Vittorio Piola (18 July 1970 – 15 February 1972)
- Decio Lucio Grandoni (22 July 1972 – 12 December 1974)
- Clemente Riva, Rosminians (I.C.) (24 May 1975 – 30 March 1999)
- Archbishop Luigi Bonazzi, Apostolic Nuncio to Albania (2020 - 3 December 2025)

== Bibliography ==
- De Muro, Vincenzo (1840). Ricerche storiche e critiche sulla origine, le vicende, e la rovina di Atella antica città della Campania. Napoli: tip. di Cruscuolo. (in Italian)
- Kehr, Paul Fridolin (1925). Italia pontificia Vol. VIII (Berlin: Weidmann 1925), pp. 294-295. (in Latin)
- Lanzoni, Francesco (1927). Le diocesi d'Italia dalle origini al principio del secolo VII (an. 604). Faenza: F. Lega, pp. 204-205. (in Italian)
- Maisto, F.P. (1884). Memorie storico-critiche sulla vita di S. Elpidio Vescovo africano e Patrono di S. Arpino. Napoli 1884. (in Italian)
- Pezzella, Franco, ed. (2006). Note e documenti per la storia di Orta di Atella. Fonte i documenti per la storia atellana, 10 (in Italian). Frattamaggiore: Istituto di Studi Atellani, Mattia Cirillo. GGKEY:Y7SQYY10BBF.
- Pezone, Franco Elpidio (1979). Atella. Nuovi contributi alla conoscenza della città e delle sue "fabulae". Civilta Campana (in Italian). Istituto di Studi Atellani, tip. M. Cirillo. GGKEY:PG0EKNPFQPC.
- Ughelli, Ferdinando (1722). Italia sacra sive De episcopis Italiæ, et insularum adjacentium (in Latin). Vol. Tomus decimus (second ed.). Venice: apud Sebastianum Coleti. pp. 16–18.
