= Santa Giustina, Panesi =

Church in Panesi, Italy

Coordinates: 44°20′18″N 9°21′20″E

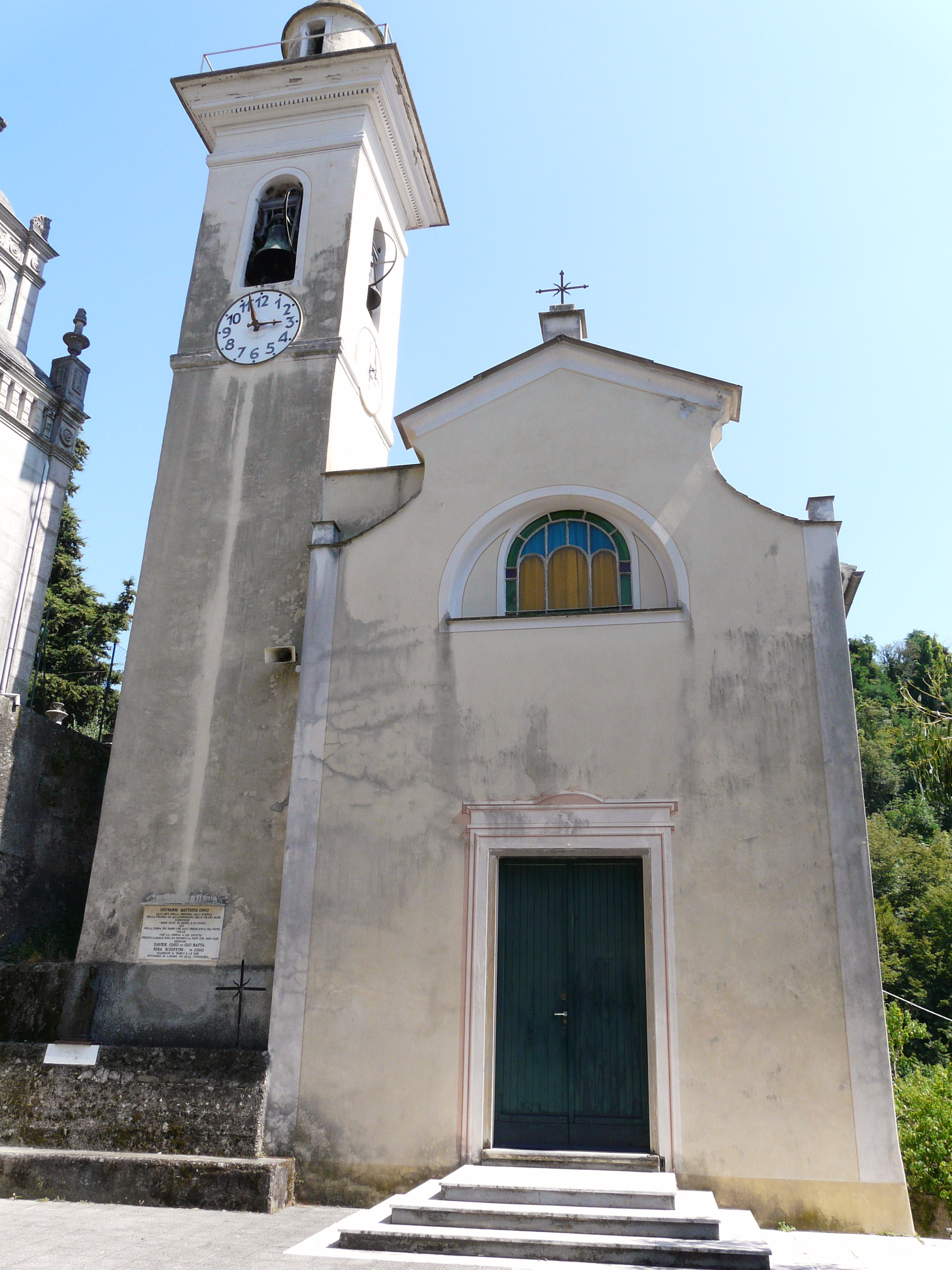

San Giustina, or Santi Giustina e Cipriano, is a rural Roman Catholic church, in Panesi, a neighborhood of the commune of Cogorno in the Metropolitan City of Genoa, region of Liguria, Italy.

A church at the site is documented since 1190. Initially under the tutelage of the Benedictine order, the present church has a plain facade with a high oculus, and a bell-tower from the 18th century. The interior houses a Crucifixion with the Madonna and Three saints including Erasmus and Francis, attributed to Santi di Tito.
