= Marquess or Marchioness of Galatone =

Coat of arms of the Squarciafico.

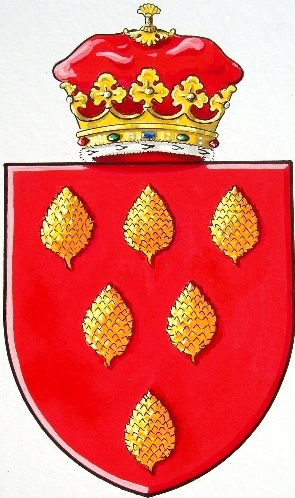
Coat of arms of the Pinelli.

Coat of arms of the Ravaschieri.

Coat of arms of the Fieschi.

Marquess or Marchioness of Galatone (Marchese o Marchesa di Galatone) was a hereditary title of Spanish nobility created by King Philip II of Spain for Stefano Squarciafico, Patrician of Genoa, on 29 June 1562, and inherited according to Spanish nobiliary law. The title is currently (yet unofficially) held by the Prince or Princess Belmonte.

The title is not currently extant in the peerage of Spain.

== Creation of the title ==
The feudality of Galatone was acquired in 1557 by Uberto Squarciafico of Genoa, who died on 8 February 1562 leaving his property to his son Don Stefano. On 29 June of that year, the title Marquess of Galatone was conferred on Stefano by King Philip II of Spain, son of Emperor Charles V. Stefano married Vittoria Doria. He died in 1568, and is buried in the family's Chapel, the Cappella di San Marco, at Copertino Castle.

== Succession ==
- Giulio Cesare, younger son of Uberto, succeeded his brother Don Stefano as 2nd Marquess of Galatone in 1568, and was placed under the guardianship of Uberto's sister Livia and her husband Galeazzo Pinelli owing to his youth. Livia had been given the County of Copertino by Uberto, as a dowry on her marriage. Giulio Cesare married Lelia Spinola, daughter of the Duke of Sesto and Marquess of Venafro (Filippo Spinola). As a widow, Lelia married on 27 November 1585 Gian Francesco Oliva Grimaldi, 2nd Duke of Terranova and Seigneur of Gerace. Her son by that marriage, Girolamo Oliva Grimaldi, was created 1st Prince of Gerace.
- Cosimo, son of Galeazzo and Livia, succeeded to the lands, Castle and title as 3rd Marquess of Galatone in 1588. From his mother he also inherited the title Count of Copertino. He married Nicoletta Grillo (died 28 October 1617). Cosimo was responsible for the construction of the Church and Convent of San Francesco in Galatone in 1599-1600 at his own expense, dedicating it to the care of the Capuchins and reserving the Chapel of the Immacolata as a family crypt. Cosimo died in 1601.
- Galeazzo (II) Francesco, only son of Cosimo and Nicoletta, was created 1st Duke of Acerenza on 12 April 1593 by Philip II of Spain. He succeeded his father in 1602 as 4th Marquess of Galatone and Count of Copertino. Galeazzo's daughter Donna Caterina also resided at Galatone, and is buried in the Chapel of the Immacolata, along with her cousin Donna Nicoletta, daughter of Galeazzo (I).
- Cosimo (II) succeeded as 2nd Duke of Acerenza, 5th Marquess of Galatone and Count of Copertino, and married Anna Maria Ravaschieri, daughter of Orazio Giovan Battista Ravaschieri Fieschi, 1st Prince of Belmonte, bringing her from the convent where she had been enclosed. Together they had nine children.
- Don Gaetano Pinelli, second son of Duke Cosimo and Duchess Anna Maria, succeeded to as 3rd Duke of Acerenza, 6th Marquess of Galatone and Count of Copertino, since his elder brother Don Gaetano Antonio was considered fool. Duke Gaetano died at Belmonte (now Belmonte Calabro) in 1711, with no direct heir. His titles and lands therefore passed to his first cousin, who was nephew to the 3rd Duchess, Anna Maria.
- Oronzo Ravaschieri Fieschi Pinelli, 5th Prince of Belmonte, succeeded to the Dukedom of Acerenza as 4th Duke, the Marquessate of Galatone as 7th Marquess, and the Earldom (Contea) of Copertino.

For the descent of the Dukedom of Acerenza, Marquessate of Galatone and County of Copertino to the present day in the line of the Princes and Princesses of Belmonte, see Prince or Princess Belmonte. See also the Dukedom of Acerenza, for the line of the Dukes prior to their marriage alliance with the Ravaschieri Fieschi, Princes of Belmonte.
