= Canio =

Canio is a name. Notable people with this name include:

- Canio of Atella, also known as San Canio and Saint Canius
- Cristián Canío (born 1981), Chilean football player
- Luigi De Canio (born 1957), Italian football player
- Paolo Di Canio (born 1968), Italian football player
- Virgilio Canio Corbo (1918–1991), Italian friar

== Fictional characters ==
- Canio, from the opera Pagliacci

== See also ==
- DeCanio
- Cania (gens)
