= Orazio Giovan Battista Ravaschieri Fieschi =

Orazio Giovan Battista Ravaschieri Fieschi (died 12 October 1645) was a wealthy nobleman and patrician ('patrizio') of Genoa descending from the Fieschi, Counts Palatine of Lavagna, in what is now Liguria. He was appointed Grand Seneschal of Naples ('Gran Siniscalco del Regno di Sicilia'), and, on 5 March 1619, he was elevated to the title of Prince of Belmonte at Madrid by Philip III of Spain. Orazio descended from a line of imperial and royal bankers, his great-grandfather Giovan Battista and grandfather having been Treasurers (Maestri di Zecca) to Charles V, Holy Roman Emperor, and King Philip II of Spain respectively.

Prince of Belmonte was the grandson of Germano Ravaschieri Fieschi and Antonia Scorza, and the son of Giovan Battista Ravaschieri Fieschi, 1st Baron of Belmonte and 1st Baron of Badolato and his wife Maria, the heiress of the feudality of Girifalco from her uncle Pietro Francesco Ravaschieri Fieschi. Maria was herself the daughter of Torino Ravaschieri Fieschi, Treasurer of Calabria, and his wife Vittoria Spinola.

Upon Orazio's death his titles and estates passed to his son, Daniele Domenico Ravaschieri Fieschi, 2nd Prince of Belmonte.

== See also ==
- Belmonte Calabro

Italian nobility
Preceded by New creation	Prince of Belmonte (Principe di Belmonte); 1619–1685	Succeeded by Daniele Domenico Ravaschieri Fieschi
