= Acerenza Cathedral =

Cathedral in Acerenza, Italy

Coordinates: 40°47′50″N 15°56′30″E

Acerenza Cathedral Cathedral of the Assumption of Mary and Saint Canius (Cattedrale di Santa Maria Assunta e San Canio)
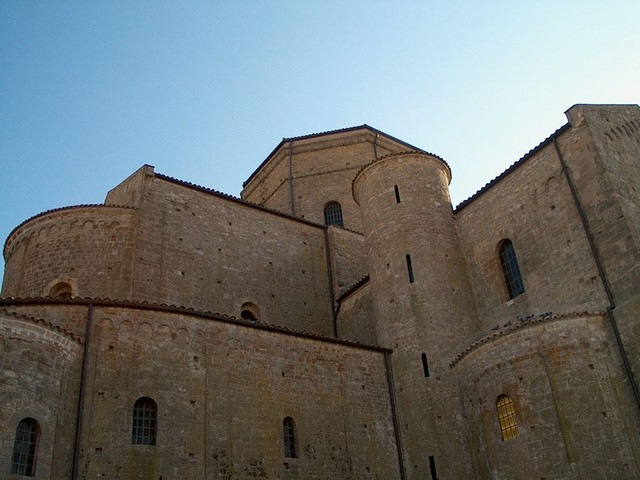
- The eastern part of the cathedral

Religion
- Affiliation: Roman Catholic
- Province: Potenza

Location
- Location: Acerenza, Italy
- Interactive map of Acerenza Cathedral; Cathedral of the Assumption of Mary and Saint Canius (Cattedrale di Santa Maria Assunta e San Canio)

Architecture
- Type: Church
- Style: Romanesque
- Groundbreaking: 11c
- Completed: 13c

Acerenza Cathedral (Italian: Duomo di Acerenza, Cattedrale di Santa Maria Assunta e San Canio) is a Roman Catholic cathedral dedicated to the Assumption of the Blessed Virgin Mary and to Saint Canius in the town of Acerenza, in the province of Potenza and the region of Basilicata, Italy. It is the seat of the Archbishop of Acerenza. It was declared a minor basilica in 1956.

The cathedral is one of the most notable Romanesque structures in this part of Italy.

== History and description ==
Location of the cathedral

The diocese was established by the late 5th century, but the structure of the present Romanesque cathedral building dates from 1080, when construction was begun under archbishop Arnald of Cluny. The site however is far more ancient and traces remain in the present building both of a pagan temple to Hercules Acheruntinus and of the earlier Christian church.

It has a Latin cross ground plan, and three aisles, which terminate in a raised presbytery behind which is an apse with an ambulatory and three radiating chapels, an unusual feature in Italian church design; the transept also terminates at either end in a semi-circular chapel. The ambulatory contains the altar which houses the relics of Saint Canius (or Canus; Italian: San Canio).

The crypt dates from 1524 and contains what is believed to be the sarcophagus of Saint Canius.

The campanile was added in 1555, and reuses many interesting fragments of ancient stonework, including two Roman sarcophagi and a sacrificial altar decorated with bulls' heads.

The interior of the cathedral features many unusual zoomorphic and floral carvings, in the Cluniac manner, the possible symbolic significance of which has caused speculation.

== Works of art ==
Of special note are a polyptych showing Our Lady of the Rosary and the Fifteen Mysteries, with Saints Dominic and Thomas, made by Antonio Stabile in 1583, and four frescos in the cloister by Giovanni Todisco di Abriola.

The cathedral also possesses a noted marble portrait bust of the Emperor Julian the Apostate, which used to be believed to show Saint Canius.

== Images ==
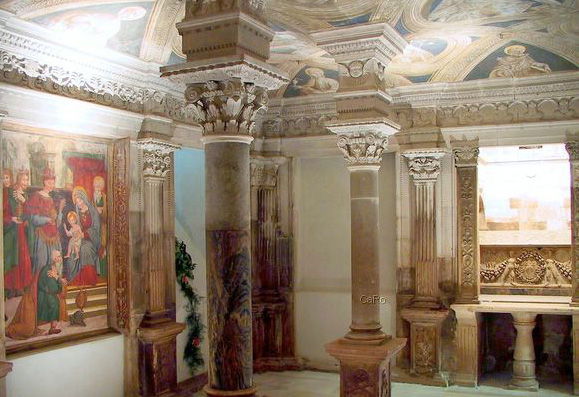
Crypt

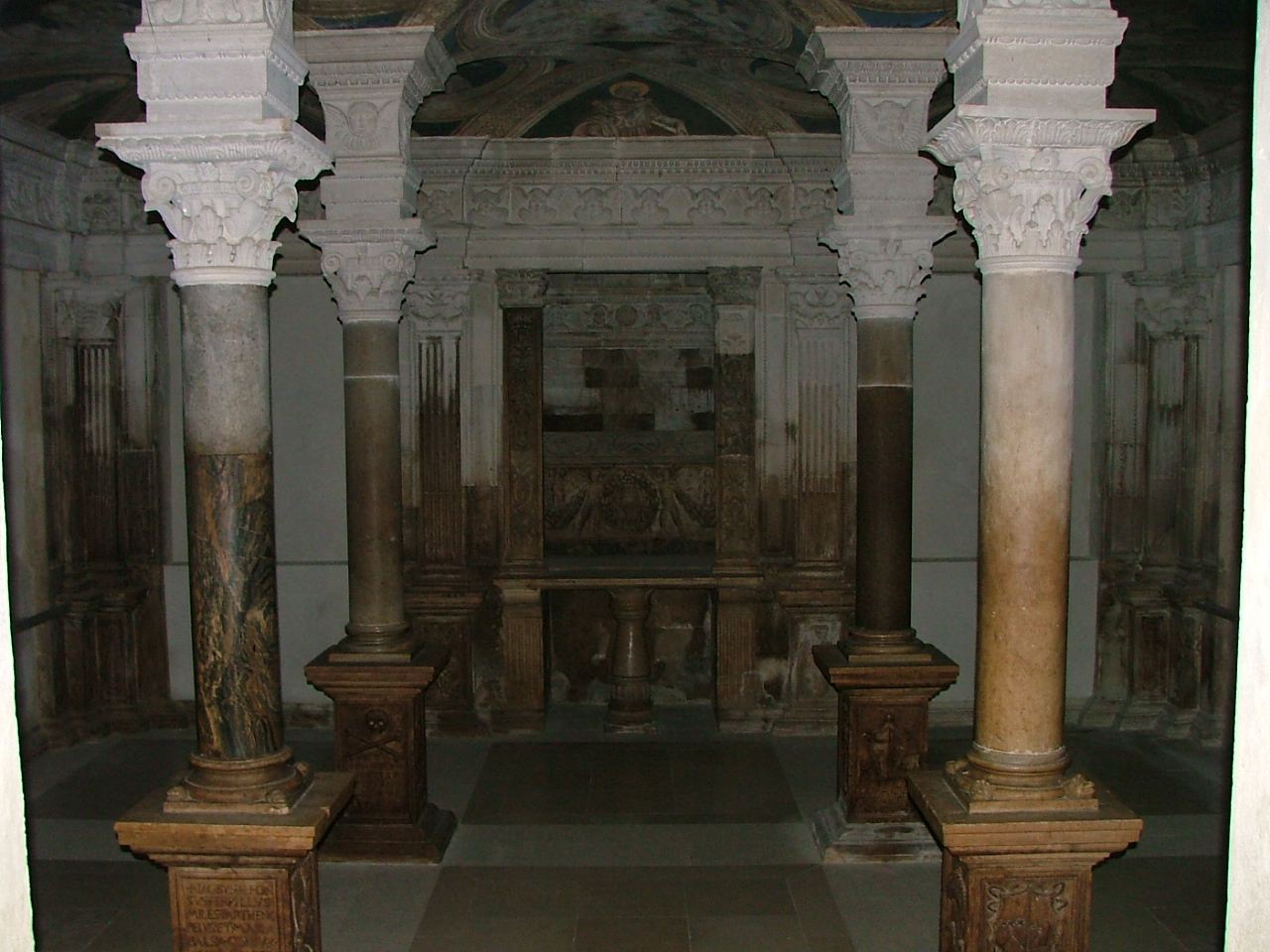
Crypt

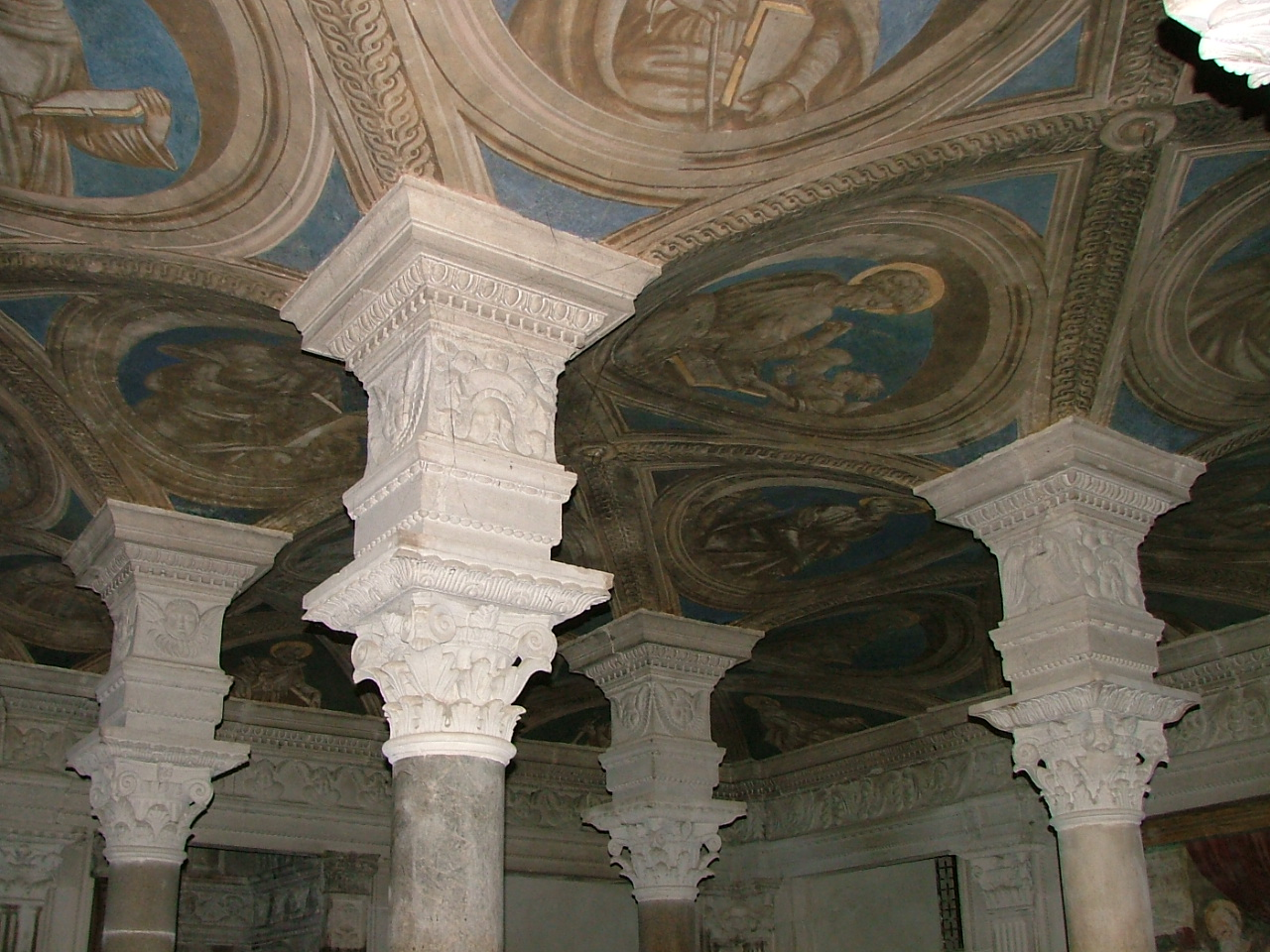
Crypt ceiling

== Sources ==
- Altrabasilicata.com Acerenza Cathedral (in Italian)
- Images of the cathedral (in Italian)
- Acerenza town website: Cattedrale (in Italian)
- Official website of the Archdiocese of Acerenza: Cattedrale (in Italian)
