= DeCanio =

DeCanio is a surname. Notable people with the surname include:

- Matt DeCanio (born 1977), American cyclist
- Stephen DeCanio (born 1942), American academic

== See also ==
- Canio
