= Elpidius of Atella =

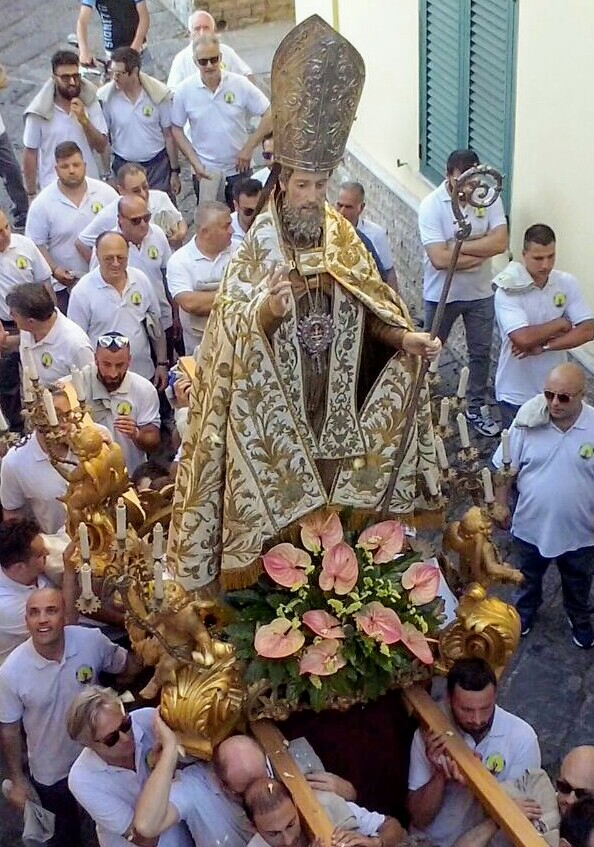
- Born: 388; Carthage
- Died: 452; Atella
- Venerated in: Sant'Arpino, Casapulla
- Feast: 24 May

Elpidius of Atella, or Elpidio in Italian (died 452), is a Christian saint. He was a bishop of the city of Atella, from 432 for about 20 years.

== Life ==
Elpidius was born in 388 to a noble family. He had a brother named Canius and a nephew named Elpidius, both priests. In about 420, at the age of 30, he was consecrated bishop. Later, due to the vandalic persecution of Gaiseric, twelve bishops, including Elpidius, were sentenced to death. They were embarked on a ship without oars or sails, but the boat was wrecked near the coast of Castel Volturno, in Campania.

In 432 he became bishop of Atella. Elpidius, informed of the death of bishop Canius, erected a small temple on the site to guard his venerated remains, and placed this couplet in front of the basilica: Elpidius praesul hoc templum condidit almum, o Canio martyr, ductus amore tuo. On May 24, 452, he died.

== Veneration ==
On 11 January 460, his body was buried in the Cathedral of Atella, where it remained until 787, when, following the incursions of the Longobards, it was moved to the city of Salerno, where it still rests in the crypt of the Cathedral of St. Matthew.

In 1958, archbishop Demetrio Moscato wanted to carry out a canonical exhumation and reconnaissance of the mortal remains of the saints buried in the crypt of the Salerno cathedral, properly under the "Altar of the Holy Confessors". Among the other relics were also found those of the three saints: Elpidius Bishop of Atella, Cionius presbyter and Elpicius deacon, placed there by archbishop Alfano I in March 1081, as is clearly stated in a marble inscription.

== Sources ==
- Life of Sant'Elpidio (in Italian)
