= Acerenza =

Acerenza Lagerénze (Neapolitan)
- Comune
- Comune di Acerenza
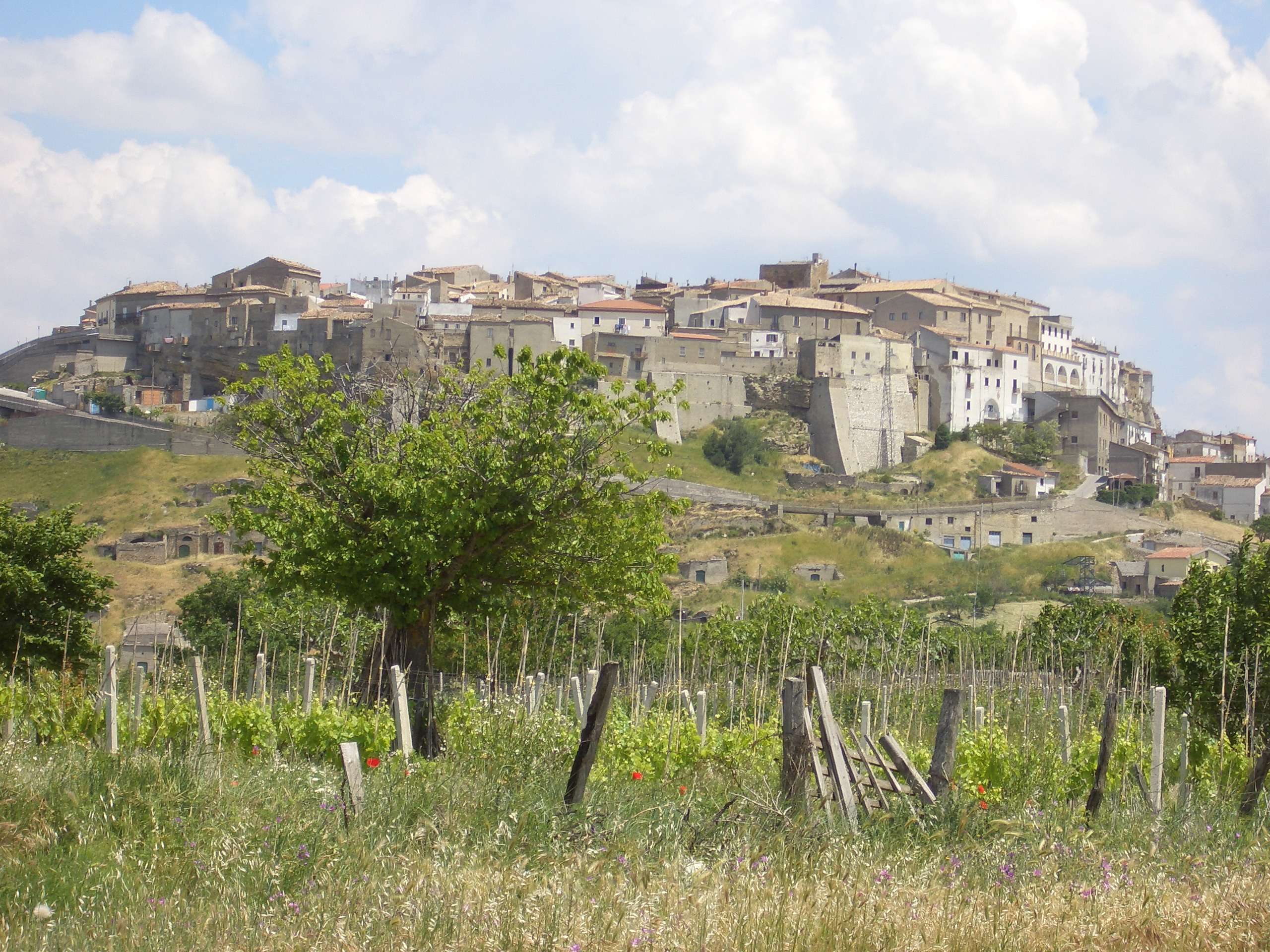
- View of Acerenza

- Location of Acerenza in Italy Acerenza (Basilicata)
- Coordinates: 40°47′48.85″N 15°56′26.45″E
- Country: Italy
- Region: Basilicata
- Province: Potenza (PZ)

Government
  - Mayor: Fernando Scattone

Area
  - Total: 77 km^{2} (30 sq mi)
- Elevation: 833 m (2,733 ft)

Population (31 December 2019)
  - Total: 2,268
  - Density: 29/km^{2} (76/sq mi)
- Demonym: Acheruntini
- Time zone: UTC+1 (CET)
  - Summer (DST): UTC+2 (CEST)
- Postal code: 85011
- Dialing code: 0971
- ISTAT code: 076002
- Patron saint: St. Canio
- Saint day: 25 May
- Website: Official website

Acerenza (Italian: [atʃeˈrɛntsa]; Lucanian: Lagerénze) is a town and comune (municipality) in the province of Potenza, in the Southern Italian region of Basilicata. It is one of I Borghi più belli d'Italia ("The most beautiful villages of Italy").

== History ==
With its strategic position 800 metres (2,600 ft) above sea-level, Acerenza has been sacked by a series of invaders.

The town, then known as Aceruntia, Acheruntia or Acherontia, was conquered by the Romans in 318 BC. Later, it was taken by the Ostrogoths (it was mentioned as an important fortress during the Gothic Wars) and then the Lombards, who fortified the town. In 788 Charlemagne ordered that its walls be destroyed. In 1041, after a period in which it was fought over by the Principality of Salerno and the Byzantine Empire, it was conquered again by the Norman Robert Guiscard.

The town has been the see of a bishop since at least 499, when a Justus is known, and an archbishop since 1068. According to legend, the town's first bishop was appointed by St. Peter.

From the 16th century, Acerenza was held under the feudal lordship of the Marquess of Galatone, that family being granted the title Duke of Acerenza on 12 April 1593 by Philip II of Spain. Through marriage the duchy of Acerenza was inherited by the family of the Prince Belmonte, in whose line the title has descended to the present day.

== Main sights ==
- Acerenza Cathedral, begun in 1080 by archbishop Arnando. In Romanesque-Gothic style, it houses a famed marble bust of Julian the Apostate. It has a nave and two aisles with 16th century canvasses, and a crypt from 1524.
- The church of San Laviero Martire (12th century). It has a Baroque-style stone high altar with an altarpiece of the Martyrdom of Saint Laviero (18th century).

== In popular culture ==
The 2019 movie From the Vine is set in Acerenza.
