= Spartacus: War of the Damned =

Third season of television series

- Season 3
- Region 1 DVD cover
- Starring: Liam McIntyre; Manu Bennett; Dustin Clare; Dan Feuerriegel; Cynthia Addai-Robinson; Simon Merrells; Ellen Hollman; Ditch Davey; Pana Hema Taylor; Jenna Lind; Christian Antidormi; Anna Hutchison; Todd Lasance
- No. of episodes: 10

Release
- Original network: Starz
- Original release: January 25 – April 12, 2013

Season chronology
- ← Previous; Vengeance

Spartacus: War of the Damned is the third and final season of the American television series Spartacus, a Starz television series, which follows Spartacus: Vengeance. The series was inspired by the historical figure of Spartacus (played by Liam McIntyre from the second season and by Andy Whitfield in the first season), a Thracian gladiator who, from 73 to 71 BC, led a major slave uprising against the Roman Republic. It premiered on January 25, 2013, and concluded on April 12, 2013.

== Cast and characters ==
=== Main cast ===
==== Rebels ====
- Liam McIntyre as Spartacus – a Thracian warrior condemned to slavery as a gladiator in the House of Batiatus. After leading an uprising at the ludus, he and his rebel army have experienced great success against the forces of Rome, but are in for a great struggle against the forces of Crassus.
- Manu Bennett as Crixus – a Gallic warrior who is the second-in-command in the rebel revolt. Naevia's lover.
- Dustin Clare as Gannicus – a Celtic warrior, and former gladiator who has taken up arms against the Republic to honor the memory of Oenomaus.
- Dan Feuerriegel as Agron – a Germanic warrior, leader among the rebel army and Nasir's lover.
- Cynthia Addai-Robinson as Naevia – a Phoenician former slave. She struggles with the emotional wounds that were inflicted upon her by various Roman abusers. Crixus' lover.
- Ellen Hollman as Saxa – a Germanic warrior and Gannicus' lover.
- Pana Hema Taylor as Nasir – a Syrian warrior and Agron's lover.
- Blessing Mokgohloa as Castus – a Cilician pirate who joins the rebellion.
- Ditch Davey as Nemetes – a Germanic warrior who is conflicted about the rebellion, and his role in it.
- Anna Hutchison as Laeta – a well-to-do Roman citizen whose life is changed forever when her husband is killed and she is taken captive by Spartacus after the rebel invasion of her city. Laeta is eventually forced into the rebellion and becomes Spartacus' lover after being unjustly branded as a slave by Crassus for aiding the rebels, despite the fact that she only did it to save her people.
- Jenna Lind as Kore – Crassus' loyal body slave and lover, who reluctantly joins the rebellion after she is raped by her ex-friend (and Crassus' son), Tiberius, as revenge against his father.
- Gwendoline Taylor as Sibyl – a young slave who becomes smitten with Gannicus after he saves her life.
- Barry Duffield as Lugo – a Germanic warrior.
- Heath Jones as Donar – a former gladiator from the House of Batiatus, and a loyal warrior in the rebellion.
- Luna Rioumina as Belesa – Saxa's second lover.
- Ayşe Tezel as Canthara – a slave whose life is saved by Caesar.
- Vanessa Cater as Verenda – a rebel from Gaul that fought under Crixus.

==== Romans ====
- Simon Merrells as Marcus Licinius Crassus – The richest man in Rome. After many unsuccessful attempts at ending the revolt, the Roman Senate tasks Crassus with the responsibility of putting down the rebellion.
- Christian Antidormi as Tiberius Licinius Crassus – The eldest son of Marcus Licinius Crassus, and his father's "word and will" in Crassus' army.
- Aaron Jakubenko as Sabinus - The best friend of Tiberius and his second in command.
- Todd Lasance as Gaius Julius Caesar – A young, but seasoned soldier from a prominent family who is enlisted by Crassus to conduct infiltration and sabotage operations against the rebel camp, before returning as Crassus' second-highest-ranking officer (under his son, Tiberius).
- Roy Snow as Quintus Marcius Rufus – Crassus' commander.
- Jared Turner as Lucius Furius – Tribune of Cossinius.
- John Wraight as Lucius Cossinius – A praetor sent to defeat Spartacus.
- Joel Tobeck in a cameo role as Gnaeus Pompeius Magnus - A praetor from Rome and part of the military-political alliance known as the First Triumvirate with Crassus and Caesar.

== Episodes ==
No. overall	No. in season	Title	Directed by	Written by	Original release date	Prod. code	US viewers (millions)
24	1	"Enemies of Rome"	Mark Beesley	Steven S. DeKnight	January 25, 2013	SPS301	0.93
It has been nearly one year since the slave rebellion started (which is known as the Third Servile War). Spartacus and his followers defeat several Roman armies in their quest to "Make Rome Tremble." Spartacus tells his top commanders, Crixus, Agron and Gannicus, that they need to find a city for their followers to use as their base of operations by pointing out that hiding from the Roman armies will be hard in the upcoming winter season. Roman commanders Furius and Cossinius are getting frustrated about their lack of progress in defeating the rebels. Spartacus and a trusted band sneak up to the commanders' hideout villa to slay both of them. In Rome, after hearing of this latest defeat, the Roman Senate fears Rome itself may be endangered but lacks funds and men to mount a suitably large army. Senator Metellus turns to the immensely rich, ambitious businessman Marcus Crassus, who accepts the offer to raise a new army to put down the slave rebellion. Crassus's eager teenage son Tiberius is frustrated when learning of this because his father accepted without negotiating an accordingly exalted status or mandate, and continuous private sparring with a dearly paid skilled gladiator named Hilarus, whom he ends up killing in a fair duel. Spartacus's victory by killing Furius and Cossinius unwittingly plays into Crassus's hand, as he now formally "inherits" sole command of the Roman Army. It is later revealed that Crassus indirectly and surreptitiously provided Spartacus with the whereabouts of Furius and Cossinius, so as to have the rebel leader for himself.
25	2	"Wolves at the Gate"	Jesse Warn	Aaron Helbing & Todd Helbing	February 1, 2013	SPS302	0.82
Spartacus and his followers plan to take control of the walled, coastal city of Sinuessa, with a little help from a runaway local slave named Diotimos who inspires Spartacus's war council to choose a plan on how to take the city. Posing as a wealthy merchant, Spartacus, along with Crixus and Gannicus, scouts the city and is disgusted by the aedilis (magistrate) and Roman elite's cruelty to slaves. Spartacus circumvents the strict security measures by bribing blacksmith Attius and quickly starts a ruthless attack, which depends on his small party opening the gate from inside. Despite some complications, the tactic works and the slaves storm and capture the city after a fierce night-time battle. Although several of the rebels want to massacre all of the citizens of Sinuessa, Spartacus instead takes some of them prisoner. Meanwhile in Rome, Marcus Crassus completes preparing his legionary army just as Tiberius hopes his help will be rewarded with second rank, but fears being side-tracked in favor of the seasoned young Caius Julius Caesar. Caesar needs a rich, ambitious ally to pay his debts and finance his political campaign, but loses points with Crassus by cockily playing with his slave-lover, Kore, who unlike Crassus's wife, is invited to join the army's train.
26	3	"Men of Honor"	John Fawcett	Brent Fletcher	February 8, 2013	SPS303	0.95
Crassus sends Tiberius ahead with instructions to observe the rebel-held city of Sinuessa and wait. The ruthless Caesar won't stand for being the "boy's deputy" and beheads the "cowardly" gate keeper who escaped and reports Spartacus took the city easily. Despite Spartacus's explicit instructions, surviving Roman citizens suffer excessive cruelty, especially at the hands of Crixus's traumatized Naevia, who even kills the blacksmith Attius. Laeta, who witnessed her husband Ennius murdered by Spartacus, continues to steal bread from the rebels' kitchens and give them to fellow Sinuessa citizens in hiding. A young freed slave, named Sibyl, shows an interest in Gannicus. When Cilician pirates arrive, Spartacus learns their captain Heracleo has a secret deal with the late aedilius Ennius to use his seal to sell their laundered loot at market prices. Heracleo offers an alliance and Spartacus agrees, mainly to buy urgently needed supplies. The suspicious leaders meet outside the city, but are observed by the impatient Tiberius, who decides to attack. The pirate fleet's artillery however makes the difference. Tiberius is critically wounded by one of the rebels and is saved by his best friend, who convinces Tiberius to retreat.
27	4	"Decimation"	Michael Hurst	Seamus Kevin Fahey	February 22, 2013	SPS304	0.88
As punishment for the unauthorized attack which resulted in the pointless deaths of many Roman soldiers, Crassus orders his son and the soldiers who participated in the attack to take place in decimation, where 10 Roman soldiers will be randomly picked from the 10 legions and executed for cowardice as a consequence of the failed attack. It ultimately leads to Tiberius being forced to participate in the execution of his best friend Sabinus. Although Sinuessa's food supplies are running out and Cilican pirate captain Heracleo can't promise enough (except wine) even at premium prices, Spartacus orders that new slaves be admitted, after screening for undercover Romans, a group of which fails to force the gate. Julius Caesar manages to pose as a escaped shepherd slave and wins the confidence of dishonest schemer Nemetes. As a result, Caesar discovers and fuels dissension in Spartacus's camp, yet causes only the slaughter of most Romans and doubt in Crixus's mind as to whether Spartacus should still be obeyed. After Spartacus saves Laeta from being killed, Crixus tells Naevia that they must form their own path in their rebellion.
28	5	"Blood Brothers"	TJ Scott	Allison Miller	March 1, 2013	SPS305	1.02
Spartacus and Crixus have yet to work out their differences. Meanwhile, Tiberius seems bitter and broken, having had to beat Sabinus to death in the decimation, lashing out at the survivors. Crassus sends his mistress Kore to coax his heir with wine and tenderness, but Tiberius chooses to rape the "mere" slave by way of compensation. Senator Metellus is ignored when he arrives in the Roman camp and rudely inquires why the army hasn't moved on Sinuessa. In Sinuessa, Sibyl makes her move upon Gannicus, who returns the favor. Spartacus tests Crixus's patience to the breaking point by leaving him behind during raids on Crassus's food supplies in Sicily. After returning from the raid, Spartacus announces he's sailing on Heracleo's ships to Sicily and releases the last Roman civilians. While Crixus learns it's a diversion for a pincer movement on Crassus's camp, Caesar fuels the dissension and in-fighting among the rebels to the extreme before opening the gate with fellow undercover soldiers. Spartacus finds his maritime pincer leg sabotaged as the Cilician pirates have been sold out to Crassus. Agron, Saxa and Donar find themselves trapped in the city after finally learning of Caesar's true identity and that he helped the Roman soldiers gain entry into the city.
29	6	"Spoils of War"	Mark Beesley	Jed Whedon	March 8, 2013	SPS306	0.87
As Crassus leads an all-out attack to retake the rebel-occupied city of Sinuessa, Gannicus stays behind to cover the retreat of Spartacus and the slaves into the mountains. However, Gannicus is forced to hide behind enemy lines with Sibyl while waiting for a chance to get away. Laeta is branded a slave for her cooperation with Spartacus. Crassus rewards Heracleo for his cooperation with gold and the 'traitor' Laeta. Gannicus then manages to kill the pirate captain and rescue Laeta, who is wounded during the escape. Meanwhile, Tiberius is tasked by Crassus to hold a celebration in honor of Caesar's victory and Caesar challenges one captured slave to a duel. Caesar also bribes Senator Metellus to share the looting of the whole city. Gannicus, Sibyl, and Laeta escape and rejoin the rebels' new camp on a remote and frigid mountain range.
30	7	"Mors Indecepta"	Jesse Warn	David Kob & Mark Leitner	March 15, 2013	SPS307	1.09
With the rebel forces trapped on an impassable, snowbound ridge, Spartacus and Crixus argue with each other over the method of escape. Crassus is confident the trench and palisade he had secretly built will contain Spartacus's army and successfully sets a trap by advancing his general's tent perilously close. To see his debts paid, Caesar accepts being relegated to lower command, while Tiberius is reinstated as Crassus's right hand general. Meanwhile, Kore conspires with Caesar to expose Tiberius's rape, but hearing her lover admit that his paternal pride will forgive any filial flaw, decides instead to defect to the rebel camp. There Spartacus overcomes Crixus's impatience, which peaks at a bloody brawl. A snow storm kills a thousand rebels, but their frozen bodies are used to bridge the trench, allowing the living to break free and escape again.
31	8	"Separate Paths"	TJ Scott	Brent Fletcher	March 22, 2013	SPS308	1.09
As the spring season arrives, Spartacus and Crixus come to a crossroads in their quest, while a relentless Crassus forcefully drives his men in the pursuit of Spartacus, and the personal conflict between Tiberius and Caesar intensifies. Crixus and Spartacus decide to part ways: Crixus choosing to advance west to Rome (followed by Naevia and Agron), while Spartacus heads north to leave the country. While the rebels are celebrating after capturing another town, Laeta and Spartacus become closer. Tiberius, fearing being exposed, rapes Caesar with the aid of his men. Crixus and his followers defeat Rome's defences before being met by Crassus's troops. In the ensuing melee, Agron is wounded and Crixus and Caesar battle and Crixus is stabbed from behind by Tiberius. Crassus then orders Tiberius to decapitate him in front of Naevia as a message to the others.
32	9	"The Dead and the Dying"	Michael Hurst	Jeffrey Bell	April 5, 2013	SPS309	1.07
Crixus's army has been completely wiped out. Crassus sends Naevia back to Spartacus's camp to inform him of Crixus's death. Agron is crucified by Caesar. Spartacus captures Tiberius with the indirect help of Caesar. A distressed Crassus sends Caesar to bargain with Spartacus to release Tiberius. Spartacus hosts gladiator games (using Tiberius and a few captured Romans as the gladiators) to honor Crixus. In the final part of the games, Naevia battles Tiberius and defeats him with his own sword. Naevia spares Tiberius, however, when Spartacus reveals that Crassus and Caesar have offered the return of 500 captured rebels in exchange for Tiberius. During the exchange, Caesar tells Tiberius that he intends to punish him for all of his injustices, but Kore stabs Tiberius from behind and kills him. Caesar takes an opportunity to return Kore to Crassus in an attempt to appease him, and the 500 captured rebels (which include a wounded Agron) are returned to Spartacus. Kore and Caesar return to Crassus where they inform him of Tiberius's death, but they do not reveal to him that his son's true killer was Kore. Spartacus tells his surviving rebels to prepare for a final stand in the names of all their friends and allies who have fallen along the way.
33	10	"Victory"	Rick Jacobson	Steven S. DeKnight	April 12, 2013	SPS310	1.42
With discipline and morale among his followers breaking down, Spartacus turns his forces to face Crassus in a final (and futile) last stand against his legions, climaxing the slave revolt at the Battle of the Siler River. Prior to the battle, Spartacus meets privately with Crassus and the two come to a mutual understanding, but both agree to fight each other to the death on the battlefield. Inadvertendly, Spartacus also reveals to Crassus that Kore killed Tiberius, not him. Spartacus gives a final speech to his remaining rebels, and Nasir creates a sword that will allow his lover Agron to fight despite the critical crucifixion wounds he sustained in the previous episode. In the beginning of the battle, Spartacus and the rebels manage to kill several Romans, but Lugo is struck by a flaming projectile, and he curses the Romans around him before he dies. A Roman cavalryman kills Castus who dies without regret in Nasir and Agron's arms. Saxa is fatally wounded by several Romans and dies in Gannicus's arms after she kills the Romans who inflicted the wounds on her. Naevia and Caesar then battle, culminating in Caesar defeating her using Tiberius's sword, the same one used to behead Crixus. Caesar and Gannicus then have their battle. Gannicus manages to wound Caesar in their fight, but is surrounded and captured by Caesar's soldiers before he can finish him off. Spartacus kills a group of Roman soldiers along with their commander before finally engaging Crassus in a brutal sword battle. Spartacus manages to defeat Crassus after the two exchange severe blows, but is mortally wounded by three Roman soldiers who appear behind him and impale him with spears. Agron then arrives and kills the Romans who wounded Spartacus, then carries Spartacus away from the battlefield. Pompey arrives at the end of the battle and steals credit for defeating Spartacus. Gannicus and all of the rebel prisoners are crucified and he dies remembering his glory in the arena as the Champion of Capua. He also sees the spirit of Oenomaius, smiling as he awaits his old friend to join him in the afterlife. Crassus is forced to have Kore crucified next to Gannicus as she was known to have joined the rebels, although he forgives her for killing his son. The victorious Crassus, Caesar and Pompey return to Rome in triumph where seeds of a power struggle between all three of them begin to take form along with the plans for the First Triumvirate. Spartacus dies in Agron's arms after stating that despite losing the war, the greatest victory he has is to depart from this life a free man. In the final scene, Laeta, Sibyl and Nasir join Agron, one of the only remaining gladiators from the House of Batiatus (and the only surviving rebel general), with the 1000 survivors of the defeated rebel army march on towards the Roman border to start a new life in the country beyond the mountains. Spartacus, his true name having never been revealed, is buried in an unmarked grave which is marked by a shield with the fated Red Serpent upon it, fulfilling the prophecy his wife, Sura, made in the first episode. The series ends by showing the title character (as portrayed by Andy Whitfield) in the post-credits, covered in blood and standing victorious in the arena, proclaiming "I am Spartacus!"
