= Basilica of San Salvatore dei Fieschi =

Roman Catholic church in Cogorno, Genoa, Italy

Coordinates: 44.33052°N 9.35671°E

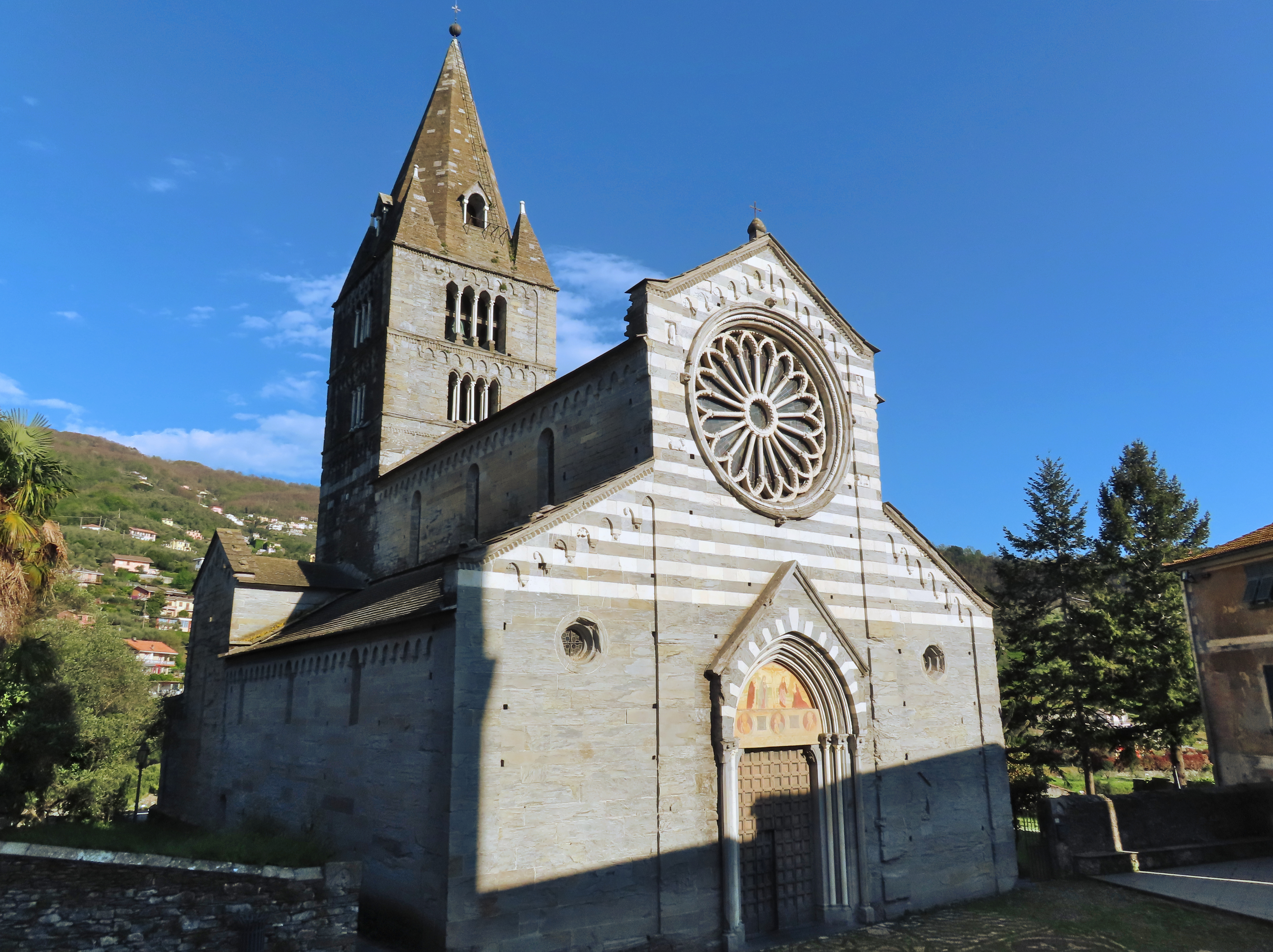
Facade and belltower

San Salvatore dei Fieschi, also known as the Basilica dei Fieschi, is a Romanesque-Gothic style church, now converted into a parish church and minor basilica, located on Piazza Innocenzo IV in a hamlet of San Salvatore, a neighborhood of the commune of Cogorno in the Metropolitan City of Genoa, region of Liguria, Italy.

== History and decoration ==
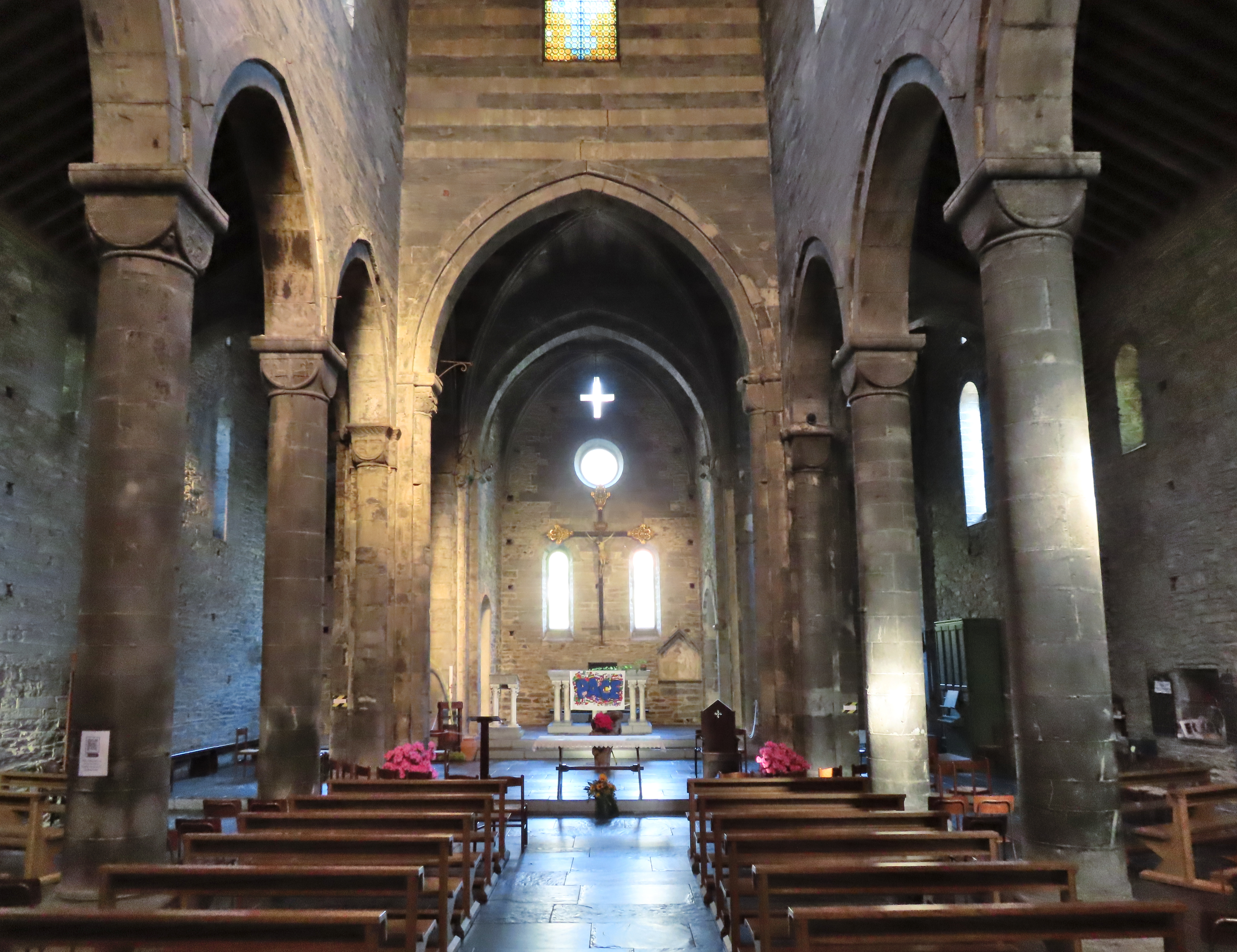
Central nave towards the apse

Construction of this church started circa 1244, commissioned by the prominent aristocratic Fieschi family, which included the then Pope Innocent IV (al secolo Sinibaldo Fieschi). It is said the stimulus for its construction was the devastation on the region perpetrated by the Holy Roman Emperor Frederick II, who had attempted to interdict Pope Innocent IV's travel to the First Council of Lyon in 1244. Work persisted into the early 1250s and included reconstruction of the count's palace (Palazzo Comitale) in front of the church, now also known as the Palazzo dei Fieschi. That building and the adjacent oratory were consecrated in 1252 by the grandchild of the Pope Innocent's brother, Pope Adrian V (al secolo Ottobuono Fieschi). The structure underwent restoration in the 19th-century by architect Maurizio Dufour.

The entrance portal has a 15th-century fresco depicting the founding pope. The architecture marks a transition from Romanesque to Gothic architecture. The layout, the echoing flanking pilasters of the portal, the merlionated roofline, and central nave demarcated by robust columns follows a Romanesque pattern, while that altitude of the nave, the ogival arches, and the Rose window with a flat apse herald the Gothic tradition. The massive square belltower at the apse is a peculiar addition with mullioned windows.
