= Giacinto of Belmonte =

Italian poet and priest (1839–1899)

- Consultor of the Index of Prohibited Books
- Church: Catholic
- Province: Cosenza
- Appointed: 1887
- Other post: General Archivist of the Cappuchins Provincial Minister of the Province of Cosenza General Councilor
- Previous post: Provincial Father: 9 May 1884 - 27 March 1885

Orders
- Ordination: 12 January 1865

Personal details
- Born: Francesco Saverio Osso; 24 October 1839 Belmonte Calabro, Cosenza, Italy
- Died: 23 October 1899 (aged 59) Acri, Cosenza, Italy

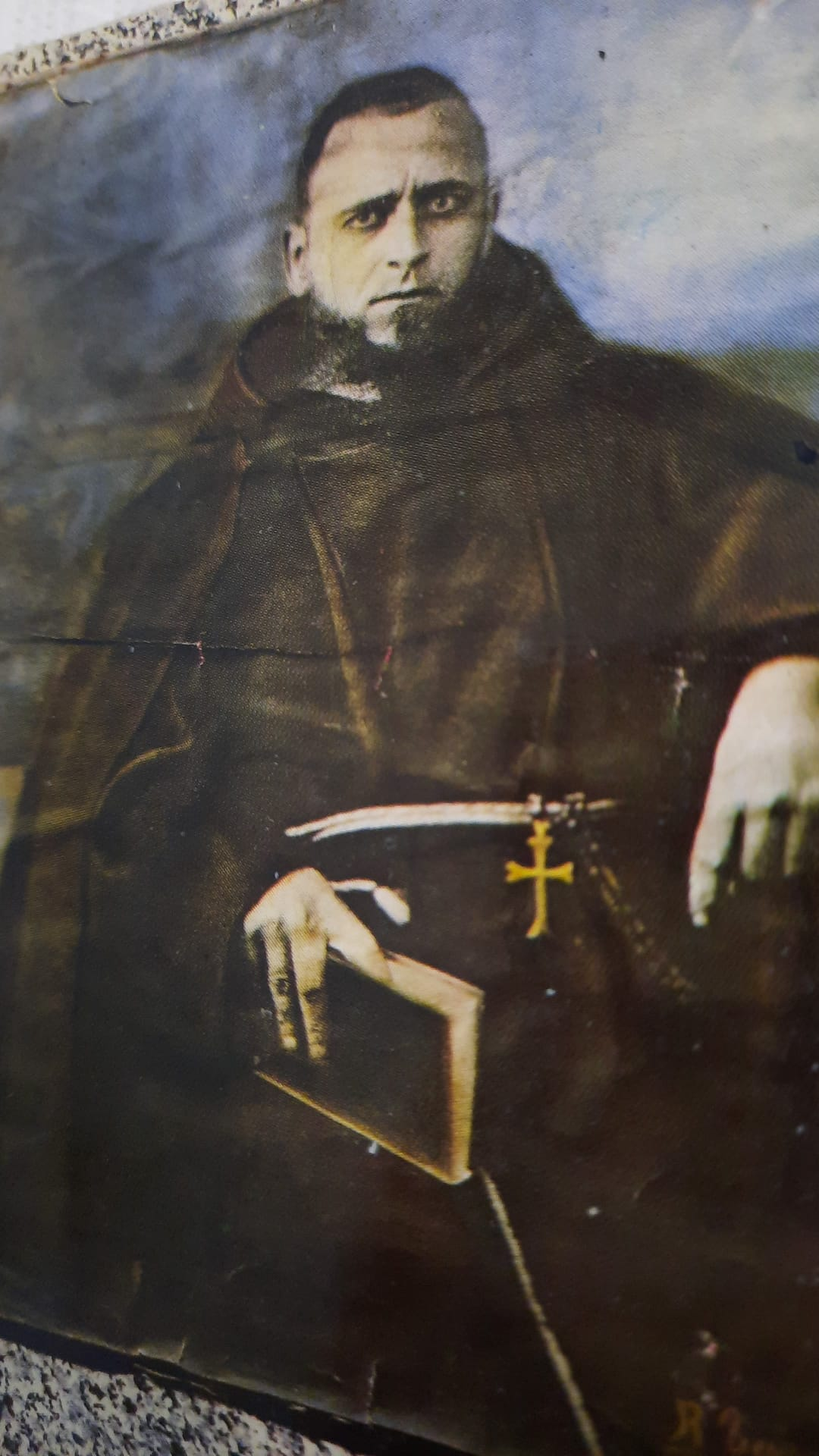
A Portrait of Father Giacinto in the Capuchin Convent in Rome.

Father Giacinto of Belmonte, born Francesco Saverio Osso (Belmonte Calabro, 24 October 1839 – Acri, 23 October 1899 ), was an Italian Christian monk, priest, and writer, belonging to the Order of Capuchin Friars.

== His Life ==
Francesco Saverio Osso was born in the locality Santa Barbara in the municipality of Belmonte Calabro. His parents were Giuseppe and Maria Osso (née Garritano) and he had eight siblings, sisters: Maria and Rosa, brothers: Nicola, Giovanni, Fedele, Pasquale, Luigi and Matteo.

In August 1857, under the guidance of Father Zaccaria of Laino Borgo, he left Belmonte Calabro for Rogliano, where he took his temporary vows on 23 October 1858. He became a full-fledged friar on 2 October 1861 in Acri, professing perpetual orders and taking the name of Father Giacinto. He was ordained a priest on 12 January 1865, again in Acri.

In 1867 the subversive law on religious property issued by the Kingdom of Italy led to the closure of the Convent of the Capuchins of Acri. Those from the Convent, including Father Giacinto, found refuge in private homes granted by private citizens.

It was in this period that he began to write many works, many of which were not published, the most important of which were Lo Stato e la Chiesa (The State and the Church), L'Impero Germanico (The German Empire), L'Avvenire d'Europa (The Future of Europe), Ove siamo (Where We Are), Considerazioni dei giorni nostri (Considerations of Our Days), I manutengoli del brigantaggio sociale (The Maintainers of Social Brigandage), Il male dei nostri giorni (The Evil of Our Days), and Poveri e i Ricchi (The Poor and the Rich), which is considered his best book. These works never obtained the imprimatur of the ecclesiastical authority.

In 1870 Father Giacinto was appointed to supervise the reopening of the Capuchin Convent of Belmonte Calabro, closed pursuant to the Murat Law of 1809 and in the possession of the Del Giudice family. The attempt failed two years later due to a lack of religious interest.

On 28 November 1875 Father Giacinto was elected IV Provincial Definitor. He continued with this role the work of acquiring ex-convents, and on 5 September 1881 he managed to purchase the Convent of Morano Calabro; on 2 October 1884 he acquired the Convent of Saracena.

In 1882 Father Giacinto, whose name had reached the ecclesiastical hierarchies in Rome, was invited to act as secretary to Cardinal Giovanni Massaia, but he refused the proposal.

On 9 May 1884 he was proclaimed Provincial Father in Rome: his mandate ended on 27 March 1885: and at this point he was called to Rome, where he arrived in the company of Brother Bernardo of Montalto Uffugo.

In 1887 Pope Leo XIII appointed him Consultor of the Index Librorum Prohibitorum.

From Rome he oversaw the reopening of a Capuchin convent in Acri, and on 11 May 1893 he was one of the promoters of the foundation of the Basilica of the Blessed Angelo da Acri, the new headquarters for the Capuchins.

In 1895, as Consultor of the Index Librorum Prohibitorum, he participated in the Second Preparatory Congregation, which discussed evolution and its ideals from the church.

In 1897 he returned to Acri from Rome, and found the Basilica of the Beato Angelo already completed.

On 4 October 1899 Father Giacinto was the victim of a robbery, following which he suffered apoplexy. On 24 October 1899, Father Giacinto died on the day before his 60th Birthday.

== Main Works ==
- La Chiesa e lo Stato. Considerazioni teologico-filosofiche, Tip. SS Concezione, Firenze 1875.
- Scritti letterari-religiosi, Cellini, Firenze 1876.
- Il beato Angelo da Acri e la Madonna Addolorata, Tip. Editrice-industriale, Roma 1885.
- I poveri e i ricchi, Tip. SS. Concezione, Firenze 1885.
- Il male dei nostri giorni, Tip. Editrice-industriale, Roma 1886.
- Racconti miracolosi per istruire dilettando, 2 voll., II ed. rifatta, Tip. Armanni, Roma 1887.
- Per il terzo centenario di S. Felice da Cantalice cappuccino, Tip. Armanni, Roma 1887.
- Compendio della vita del beato Felice da Nicosia, cappuccino, Tip. Vaticana, Roma 1888.
- Discorsi religiosi per i tempi che corrono, 2 voll., Tip. Lucentini, Roma 1889.
- Compendio della vita del venerabile Lorenzo da Zibello, sacerdote cappuccino, Tip. Guerra e Mirri, Roma 1890.
- Compendio della vita del B. Angelo da Acri missionario cappuccino, Tip. Artigianelli, Roma 1894.
- Poche cose intorno la predicazione cattolica, Tip. Fruscione e Negri, Salerno 1895.
- Vita di S. Giuseppe da Leonessa, missionario cappuccino, Tip. Artigianelli, Roma 1896.

== Bibliography ==
- Gennaro Osso, Il Cappuccino Mendicante Padre Giacinto Osso da Belmonte, ed. Comunità Montana Medio Tirreno Pollino, Paola s.d
- Giacinto da Belmonte on BeWeb, Italian Episcopal Conference.
- Giacinto da Belmonte on Sant'Angelo d'Arci
- Giacinto da Belmonte on Wikipedia Italy
