= Martial =

1st-century Latin poet from Hispania

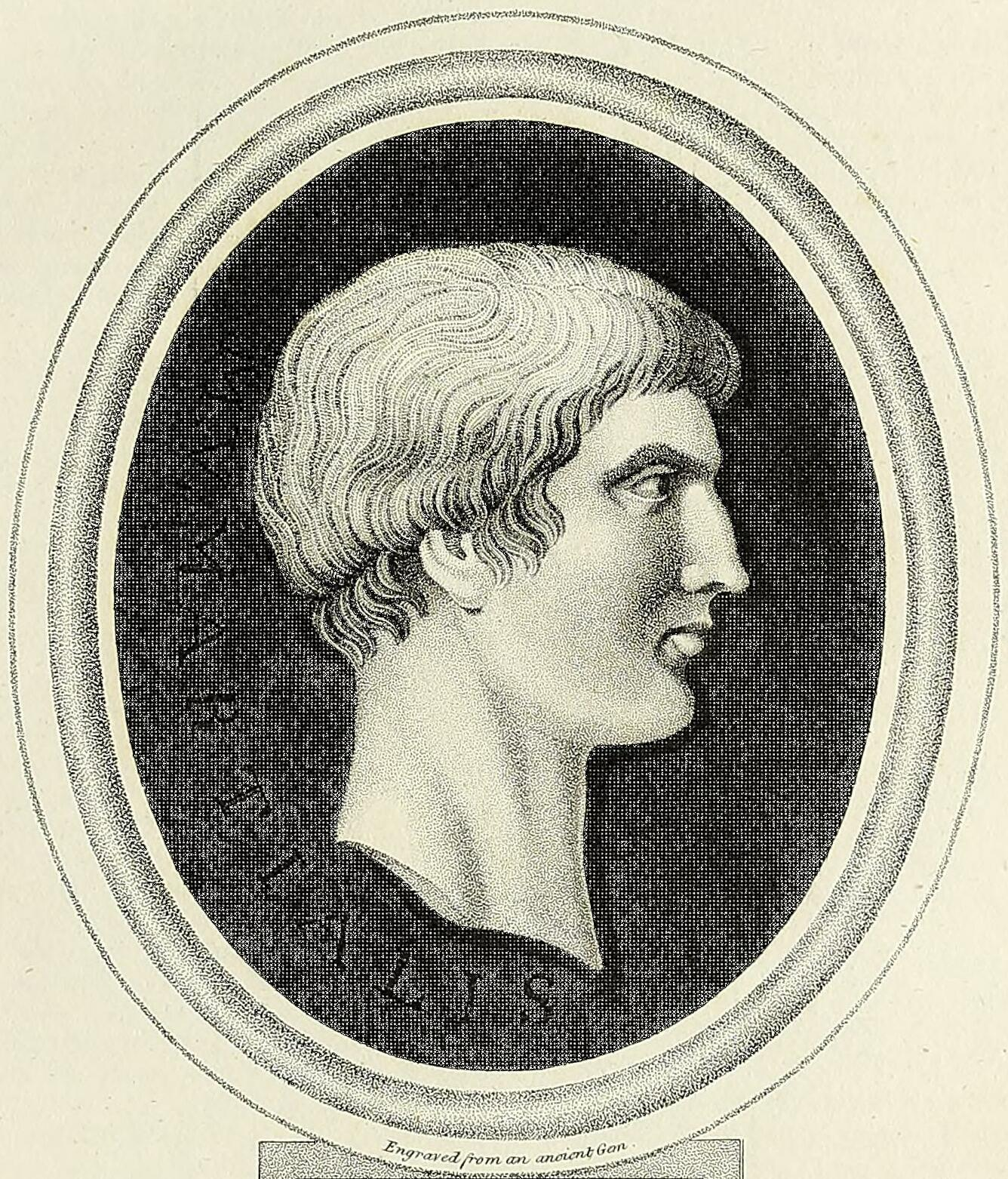
- Likeness of Martial, supposedly engraved from an ancient gem
- Born: March, between 38 and 41 AD; Augusta Bilbilis, Hispania Tarraconensis, Roman Empire (in modern Aragon, Spain)
- Died: Between 102 and 104 AD (age about 64); Augusta Bilbilis, Hispania Tarraconensis, Roman Empire
- Occupation: Author
- Writing career
- Genre: Satire
- Notable work: Epigrams

Marcus Valerius Martialis (known in English as Martial /ˈmɑːrʃəl/; March, between 38 and 41 AD – between 102 and 104 AD) was a Roman poet born in Bilbilis, Hispania (modern Spain), best known for his twelve books of Epigrams, published in Rome between AD 86 and 103, during the reigns of the emperors Domitian, Nerva and Trajan. In these poems he satirises city life and the scandalous activities of his acquaintances, and romanticises his provincial upbringing. A total of 1,561 epigrams written by him have survived, of which 1,235 are in elegiac couplets.

Martial has been called the greatest Latin epigrammatist.

== Early life ==
Knowledge of his origins and early life are derived almost entirely from his works, which can be more or less dated according to the well-known events to which they refer. In Book X of his Epigrams, composed between 95 and 98, he mentions celebrating his fifty-seventh birthday; hence he was born during March 38, 39, 40 or 41 AD (Mart. 10. 24. 1), under Caligula or Claudius.

Martial's name seems to imply that he was born a Roman citizen. His place of birth was Augusta Bilbilis (now Calatayud) in Hispania Tarraconensis, information he gives by speaking of himself as "sprung from the Celts and Iberians, and a countryman of the Tagus". In contrasting his own masculine appearance with that of an effeminate Greek, he draws particular attention to "his stiff Hispanian hair" (Mart. 10. 65. 7). Several notable 1st-century Latin writers were born in Roman Hispania, including Seneca the Elder and Seneca the Younger, Lucan and Quintilian, and Martial's contemporaries Licinianus of Bilbilis, Decianus of Emerita and Canius of Gades.

Martial's parents, Fronto and Flaccilla, appear to have died in his youth. His home in the country was evidently one of rustic comfort and plenty, affording him the amusements of hunting and fishing, which he often recalls with keen pleasure. It was sufficiently close to the town to afford him the companionship of many comrades, the few survivors of whom he looks forward to meeting again after his thirty-four years' absence (Mart. 10. 104). The memories of this old home and of other spots, the rough names and local associations which he delights to introduce into his verse, attest to the simple pleasures of his early life and were among the influences that kept his spirit alive in the stultifying routines of upper-crust social life in Rome.

Martial professes to be of the school of Catullus, Pedo and Marsus. The epigram bears to this day the form impressed upon it by his unrivalled skill in wordsmithing.

== Life in Rome ==
The success of his countrymen may have been what motivated Martial to move to Rome from Hispania once he had completed his education. This move occurred in AD 64. Seneca the Younger and Lucan may have served as his first patrons, but this is not known for sure.

Not much is known of the details of his life for the first twenty years or so after he came to Rome. He published some juvenile poems of which he thought very little in his later years, and he chuckles at a foolish bookseller who would not allow them to die a natural death (Mart. 1. 113). His faculty ripened with experience and with the knowledge of that social life which was both his theme and his inspiration; many of his best epigrams are among those written in his last years. From many answers which he makes to the remonstrances of friends—among others to those of Quintilian—it may be inferred that he was urged to practice at the bar, but that he preferred his own lazy, some would say Bohemian kind of life. He made many influential friends and patrons and secured the favor of both Titus and Domitian. From them he obtained various privileges, among others the semestris tribunatus, which conferred on him equestrian rank. Martial failed, however, in his application to Domitian for more substantial advantages, although he commemorates the glory of having been invited to dinner by him, and also the fact that he procured the privilege of citizenship for many persons on whose behalf he appealed to him.

The earliest of his extant works, known as Liber spectaculorum, was first published at the opening of the Colosseum in the reign of Titus. It relates to the theatrical performances given by him, but the book as it now stands was published about the first year of Domitian, i.e. about the year 81. The favour of the emperor procured him the countenance of some of the worst creatures at the imperial court—among them of the notorious Crispinus, and probably of Paris, the supposed author of Juvenal's exile, for whose monument Martial afterwards wrote a eulogistic epitaph. The two books, numbered by editors XIII and XIV, known by the names of Xenia and Apophoreta—inscriptions in two lines each for presents—were published at the Saturnalia of 84. In 86 he produced the first two of the twelve books on which his reputation rests.

From that time till his return to Hispania in 98 he published a volume almost every year. The first nine books and the first edition of Book X appeared in the reign of Domitian; Book XI. appeared at the end of 96, shortly after the accession of Nerva. A revised edition of book X, that which we now possess, appeared in 98, about the time of Trajan's entrance into Rome. The last book was written after three years' absence in Hispania, shortly before his death about the year 102 or 103.

These twelve books bring Martial's ordinary mode of life between the age of forty-five and sixty before us. His regular home for thirty-five years was the bustle of metropolitan Rome. He lived at first up three flights of stairs, and his "garret" overlooked the laurels in front of the portico of Agrippa. He had a small villa and unproductive farm near Nomentum, in the Sabine territory, to which he occasionally retired from the pestilence, boors and noises of the city (Mart. 2. 38, Mart. 7. 57). In his later years he had also a small house on the Quirinal, near the temple of Quirinus.

At the time when his third book was brought out he had retired for a short time to Cisalpine Gaul, in weariness, as he tells us, of his unprofitable attendance on the bigwigs of Rome. For a time he seems to have felt the charm of the new scenes which he visited, and in a later book (Mart 4. 25) he contemplates the prospect of retiring to the neighbourhood of Aquileia and the Timavus. But the spell exercised over him by Rome and Roman society was too great; even the epigrams sent from Forum Corneli and the Aemilian Way ring much more of the Roman forum, and of the streets, baths, porticos, brothels, market stalls, public houses, and clubs of Rome, than of the places from which they are dated.

His final departure from Rome was motivated by a weariness of the burdens imposed on him by his social position, and apparently the difficulties of meeting the ordinary expenses of living in the metropolis (Mart. 10. 96); and he looks forward to a return to the scenes familiar to his youth. The well-known epigram addressed to Juvenal (Mart. 12. 18) shows that for a time his ideal was happily realized; but the evidence of the prose epistle prefixed to Book XII proves and that he could not live happily away from the literary and social pleasures of Rome for long. The one consolation of his exile was a lady, Marcella, of whom he writes rather platonically as if she were his patroness—and it seems to have been a necessity of his life to always have a patron or patroness—rather than his wife or mistress.

During his life at Rome, although he never rose to a position of real independence, he seems to have known many writers of the time. In addition to Lucan and Quintilian, he numbered among his friends Silius Italicus, Juvenal and Pliny the Younger. Despite the two authors writing at the same time and having common friends, Martial and Statius are largely silent about one another, which may be explained by mutual dislike. Martial in many places shows an undisguised contempt for the artificial kind of epic on which Statius's reputation chiefly rests; and it is possible that the respectable author of the Thebaid and the Silvae felt little admiration for the life or the works of the bohemian epigrammatist.

== Martial and his patrons ==
Martial was dependent on his wealthy friends and patrons for gifts of money, for his dinner, and even for his dress, but the relation of client to patron had been recognized as an honourable one by the best Roman traditions. No blame was attached to Virgil or Horace on account of the favours which they received from Augustus and Maecenas, or of the return which they made for these favours in their verse. That old honourable relationship, however, greatly changed during the time that passed between Augustus and Domitian. Men of good birth and education, and sometimes even of high official position (Juv. 1. 117), accepted the dole (sportula). Martial was merely following a general fashion in paying his court to "a lord," and he made the best of the custom. In his earlier career he used to accompany his patrons to their villas at Baiae or Tibur, and to attend their morning levees. Later on, he went to his own small country house, near Nomentum, and sent a poem, or a small volume of his poems, as his representative at the early visit.

== Martial's character ==
Pliny the Younger, in the short tribute he pays to him on hearing of his death, wrote, "He had as much good nature as wit and pungency in his writings". Martial professes to avoid personalities in his satire, and honour and sincerity (fides and simplicitas) seem to have been the qualities he most admires in his friends. Some have found distasteful his apparent servile flattery to the worst of the many bad emperors of Rome in the 1st century. They were emperors Martial would later censure immediately after their death (Mart. 12. 6). However he seems to have disliked hypocrisy in its many forms and to be free from cant, pedantry and affectation of any kind.

Though many of his epigrams indicate a cynical disbelief in the female character, others prove that he could respect and almost revere a refined and courteous woman. His own life in Rome afforded him no experience of domestic virtue; but his epigrams show that, even in the age known to modern readers chiefly from the Satires of Juvenal, virtue was recognized as the purest source of happiness. The tenderest element in Martial's nature seems, however, to have been his affection for children and for his dependants.

== Martial's Epigrams ==
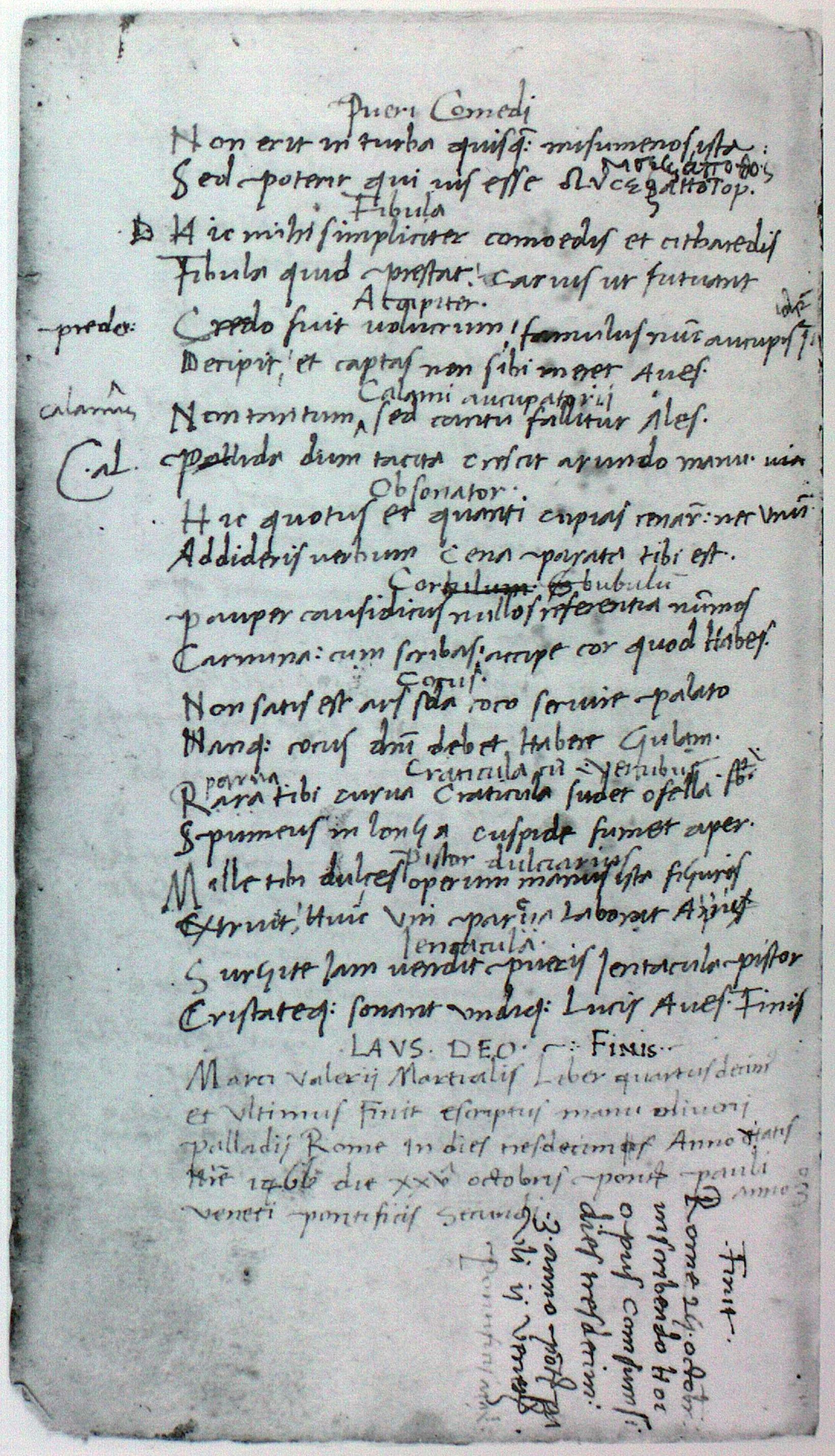
15th-century manuscript of the Epigrams

Literary interest in Martial's epigrams persists due both to their literary quality and their references to daily life in imperial Rome.

From Martial, for example, we have a glimpse of his living conditions in the city of Rome:

I live in a little cell, with a window that won't even close,
In which Boreas himself would not want to live.

— Book VIII, No. 14. 5–6

As Jo-Ann Shelton has written, "fire was a constant threat in ancient cities because wood was a common building material and people often used open fires and oil lamps. However, some people may have deliberately set fire to their property in order to collect insurance money." Martial makes this accusation in one of his epigrams:

Tongilianus, you paid two hundred for your house;
An accident too common in this city destroyed it.
You collected ten times more. Doesn't it seem, I pray,
That you set fire to your own house, Tongilianus?

— Book III, No. 52

Martial also pours scorn on the doctors of his day:

I felt a little ill and called Dr. Symmachus.
Well, you came, Symmachus, but you brought 100 medical students with you.
One hundred ice-cold hands poked and jabbed me.
I didn't have a fever, Symmachus, when I called you–but now I do.

— Book V, No. 9

Martial's epigrams also refer to the cruelty shown to slaves in Roman society. Below, he chides a man named Rufus for flogging his cook for a minor mistake:

You say that the hare isn't cooked, and ask for the whip;
Rufus, you prefer to carve up your cook than your hare.

— Book III, No. 94

Martial's epigrams are also characterized by their biting and often scathing sense of wit as well as for their lewdness; this has earned him a place in literary history as the original insult comic. Below is a sample of his more insulting work:

You feign youth, Laetinus, with your dyed hair
So suddenly you are a raven, but just now you were a swan.
You do not deceive everyone. Proserpina knows you are grey-haired;
She will remove the mask from your head.

— Book III, No. 43

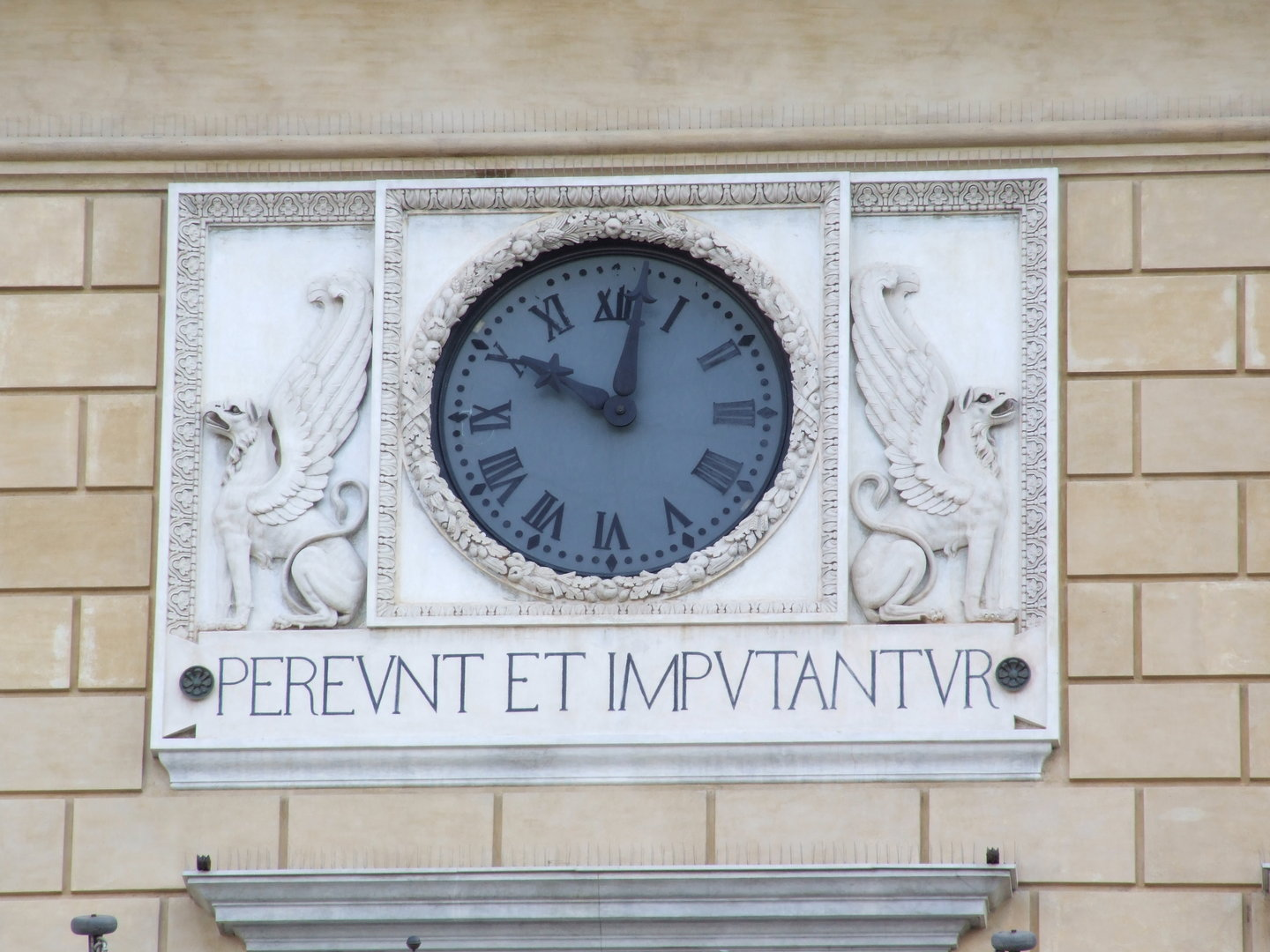
Pereunt et imputantur ("[the hours] pass away and [yet] are accounted for") is commonly inscribed on clocks, as on this one in Palermo.

Rumor tells, Chiona, that you are a virgin,
and that nothing is purer than your fleshy delights.
Nevertheless, you do not bathe with the correct part covered:
if you have the decency, move your panties onto your face.

— Book III, No. 87

'You are a frank man', you are always telling me, Cerylus.
Anyone who speaks against you, Cerylus, is a frank man.

— Book I, No. 67

Try eating lettuce and soft mallows:
For you, Phoebus, have the strained face of a defecating man.

— Book III, No. 89

Or the following two examples (in translations by Mark Ynys-Mon):

Fabullus' wife Bassa frequently totes
A friend's baby, on which she loudly dotes.
Why does she take on this childcare duty?
It explains farts that are somewhat fruity.

— Book IV, No. 87

With your giant nose and cock
I bet you can with ease
When you get excited
check the end for cheese.

— Book VI, No. 36

Along with Roman graffiti, the Epigrams are important sources of Latin obscene words.

== Reception ==
The works of Martial became highly valued on their discovery by the Renaissance, whose writers often saw them as sharing an eye for the urban vices of their own times. The poet's influence is seen in Juvenal, late classical literature, the Carolingian revival, the Renaissance in France and Italy, the Siglo de Oro, and early modern English and German poetry, until he became unfashionable with the growth of the Romantic movement.

The 21st century has seen a resurgence of scholarly attention to Martial's work.
