= Fieschi family =

Italian noble family from Genoa

Fieschi
- Country: Republic of Genoa
- Founded: 11th century
- Founder: Ugo Fliscus
- Final head: Maria Maddalena Fieschi
- Titles: Pope (non-hereditary); Bishop (non-hereditary); Prelate (non-hereditary); Count of Lavagna; Marquis of Savignone; Lord of Crocefieschi; Prince of Masserano; Marquis of Romagnano; Lord of Montoggio; Lord of Mongiardino

The House of Fieschi (Italian pronunciation: [ˈfjeski]) were an old Italian noble family from Genoa, Italy, from whom descend the Fieschi Ravaschieri Princes of Belmonte. Of ancient origin, they took their name from the progenitor Ugo Fliscus, descendants of the counts of Lavagna.

The family had close ties with the Angevin kings of Sicily. Later they also established links with French kings. The Fieschi family produced two popes and 72 cardinals.

== History ==
=== Counts of Lavagna ===
As Counts of Lavagna the Fieschi possessed a sort of judicial and political independence from the Republic of Genoa. This family, based in the nearby village of San Salvatore di Cogorno, built a vast noble domain in the Ligurian Levant and Chiavari hinterland.

In 1010 the investiture of the Fieschi took place at Genoa: the family were created Counts of Lavagna. In the words of Henry the Holy, King of Italy since 1004 and Holy Roman Emperor from 1014 and the last of the Ottonian dynasty, 'Ordiniamo il predominato Fieschi vicario generale di essa città con ampio potere.' ('We appoint the pre-eminent Fieschi to be Vicars General of this city-state with broad powers').

During the Middle Ages there were countless political clashes for the domination of Lavagna between the Fieschis and the Republic of Genoa which had an always faithful ally and a defensive border stronghold in the nearby Chiavari. During this time, the strongest antagonists of the family proved to be the Dorias.

When the village became a free municipality, around the 12th century, the Fieschi lordship continued, within the limits, to carry out the administrative and political work of Lavagna. In the fourteenth century, with the absorption of the Fieschis into the highest Genoese nobility, a gradual downsizing of the Lavagna dominions began.

=== Other important roles ===
Males of the Fieschi— all of them styled Conte di Lavagna— played major roles as Guelph partisans in the governance and military history of medieval Genoa, ever in conflict with the Republic and always retaining their connection with their holdings here.

In 1138, in an agreement between the Fieschi and the commune of Genoa, the Fieschi agreed to spend part of the year in the city. They earned great riches from trading and financial activities, and later developed in numerous different branches. Apart from Liguria, they possessed fiefs in Piedmont, Lombardy, Umbria and in the Kingdom of Naples.

Sinibaldo Fieschi, younger brother to Count Opizzo, was elected Pope Innocent IV in 1243. One nephew became Patriarch Opizzo of Antioch and another was elected Pope Adrian V as one of the three popes of 1276.

In the Fieschi conspiracy of 1547, Giovanni Luigi Fieschi and the nobles unsuccessfully attempted to recapture the dogate from Andrea Doria, and the power of the Fieschi was broken.

== Famous members ==
- Sinibaldo, elected Pope Innocent IV
- Ottobuono, elected Pope Adrian V
- Alagia, niece of Ottobuono mentioned in Dante Alighieri's Divine Comedy
- Luca Fieschi, cardinal
- Opizzo Fieschi, Latin patriarch of Antioch
- Niccolò Fieschi, Italian Cardinal
- Giorgio Fieschi, Italian Cardinal
- Caterina Fieschi Adorno (1447–1510), honored as St Catherine of Genoa
- Giovanni Luigi Fieschi (1522–1547)
- Don Orazio Giovan Battista Ravaschieri Fieschi, 1st Prince of Belmonte (d. 1645)

== See also ==
- Republic of Genoa
- Basilica of San Salvatore dei Fieschi
- Lavagna
- The Fieschi Letter
- Schiller's play Fiesco
- Verdi's opera Simon Boccanegra, including a "Fiesco"
