= Lucius Furius =

Roman commander

Lucius Furius (Brocchus?) was a Roman commander who aided Publius Varinius and Lucius Cossinius against Spartacus in the Third Servile War. Furius was defeated by Spartacus and his subordinates.

== Third Servile War ==
Furius marched with 2,000 men towards Spartacus but he was ultimately defeated and killed.

== Media portrayals ==
Furius was portrayed by Jared Turner in the Starz original series Spartacus: War of the Damned.

== See also ==
- Crisis of the Roman Republic
