= Belmonte Calabro =

- Comune
- Comune di Belmonte Calabro
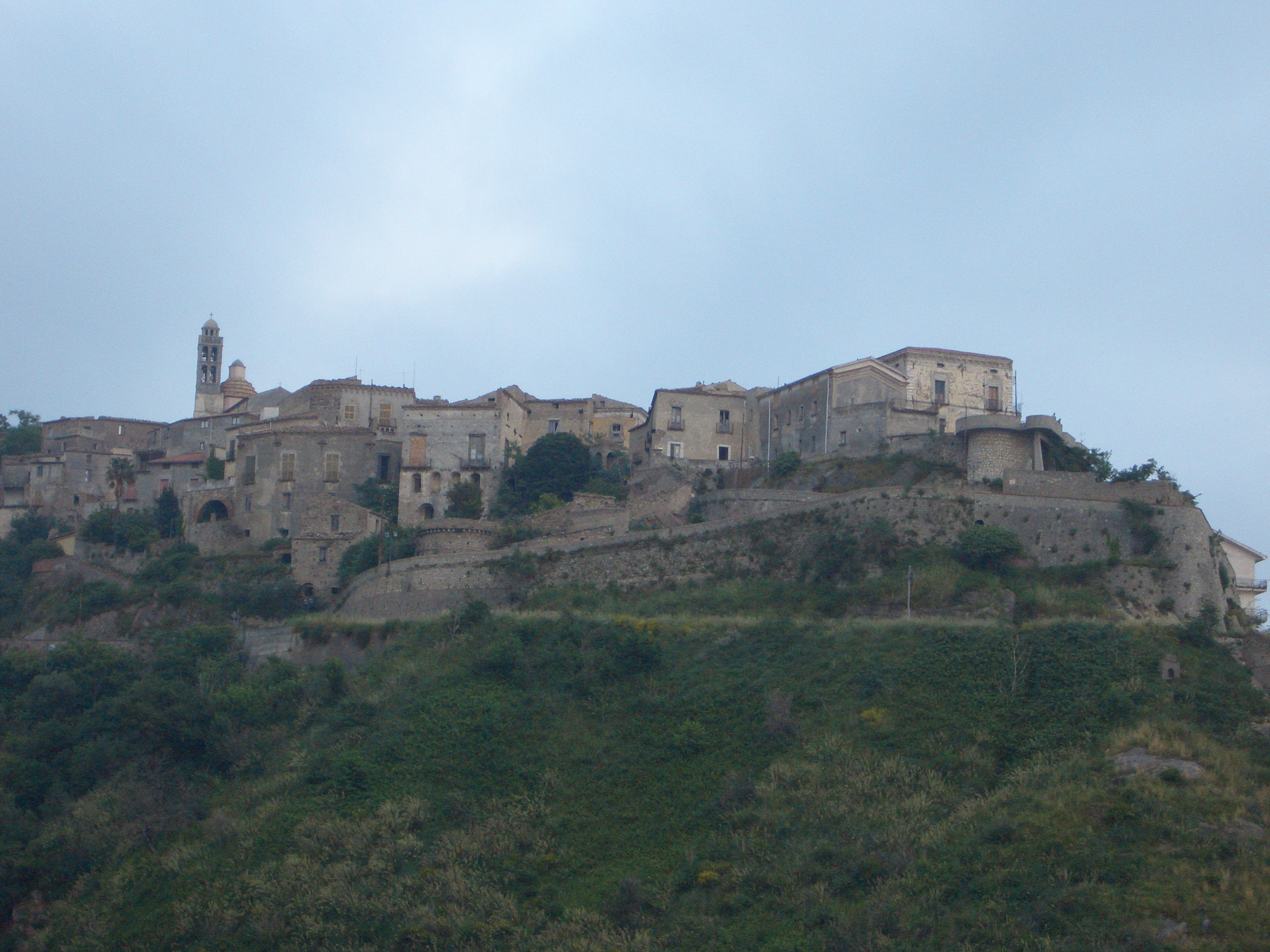

- Coat of arms

- Location within Italy Location within Calabria
- Coordinates: 39°10′N 16°5′E
- Country: Italy
- Region: Calabria
- Province: Cosenza (CS)
- Frazioni: Annunziata, Vadi, Marina di Belmonte, Santa Barbara, Salice, Spineto

Government
  - Mayor: Francesco Bruno

Area
  - Total: 23.98 km^{2} (9.26 sq mi)
- Elevation: 262 m (860 ft)

Population (30 April 2017)
  - Total: 1,986
  - Density: 82.82/km^{2} (214.5/sq mi)
- Demonym: Belmontesi
- Time zone: UTC+1 (CET)
  - Summer (DST): UTC+2 (CEST)
- Postal code: 87033
- Dialing code: 0982
- Patron saint: Assumption of Mary
- Saint day: 15 August
- Website: Official website

Belmonte Calabro, known simply as Belmonte (Calabrian: Bellimunti) prior to the proclamation of the Kingdom of Italy, is a town and comune in the province of Cosenza, in Calabria (Southern Italy). The town is perched on a hilltop on the coast of the Tyrrhenian Sea.

== History ==
Belmonte was founded in about 1270, under the reign of King Charles I of Anjou, with the construction of a castle in the territory of Amantea by Drogone di Beaumont, the marshal responsible for new fortification in Calabria, in order to provide resistance against partisans fighting for the claimant Conradin of Hohenstaufen.

During the War of the Sicilian Vespers (1282), Belmonte was conquered by Sicilian-Aragonese troops. It was elevated to the status of county, and assigned to Peter Salvacossa. In 1360 the county was awarded by Queen Joan II of Naples to a family of Amantea, which maintained it until 1443. In that year the Aragonese transformed Belmonte into a barony and assigned it to the Tarsia family, who maintained it until 1578. During the feudal tenure of this family the petrarchan poet Galeazzo di Tarsia composed his canzoniere, or Book of Songs, in the castle of Belmonte.

Under the Tarsia lordship, Belmonte was besieged several times: during the invasions of Charles VIII and Louis XII of France, between 1495 and 1503, and again in 1528 under the French marshal Lautrec. The Tarsia were succeeded by the Ravaschieri Fieschi, of the Counts Fieschi di Lavagna, a family of Genoese bankers. Feudal tenure of Belmonte is recorded to have been purchased from the Tarsia for 28,220 ducats. Under the Ravaschieri churches were constructed in Belmonte, fortifications built and palaces laid out, including the Palazzo Ravaschieri Fieschi della Torre. In 1619 the title of Prince Belmonte was granted to the Ravaschieri Fieschi by King Philip III of Spain.

The Principate of Belmonte was further enlarged in 1630 with the purchase of the town of Amantea and the manor of Saint Peter. In 1647, during the revolt of Masaniello, the Prince provided 200 of his armed Belmontese vassals to Naples to assist the Viceroy. In 1685, the Ravaschieri family had no male heir, and the principate of Belmonte passed first to the Pinelli by marriage and then in 1722 again by marriage to the Pignatelli.

Prince Antonio Pignatelli, 6th Prince of Belmonte by marriage and a Prince of the Holy Roman Empire, minted his own coinage among which was the famous "zecchino of Belmonte", a gold coin on which appears both the Prince's head and coat of arms. In 1806 and 1807 Belmonte supported Amantea and Fiumefreddo while under siege by French troops commanded by General Peyri. Belmonte's castle was the last to surrender. Under the French, Belmonte became the centre of the administrative area of Crati, comprising the territory that reaches from Amantea to Guardia Piemontese and including the cities of Aiello, Altilia, Mangone and Rogliano. With the proclamation of the Kingdom of Italy in the late 19th century, Belmonte gained the additional name of Calabro, to distinguish it from other Italian places of the same name.

The coat of arms of Belmonte itself is a palm between two towers under a princely crown. The two towers represent the fortifications of Verri and Barbarise, with the palm symbolizing the countryside between. The crown represents the historical connection with the Belmonte Princes.

Belmonte was in the news on 5 December 1930, when the English aviators Winifred Spooner and Captain Edwards were forced by mechanical breakdown to ditch into the sea whilst en route from London to Cape Town, South Africa, in what had been planned as a 5 days and nights record breaking attempt. Winifred Spooner swam the 3 kilometers to shore in complete darkness and alerted local fishermen who rescued Captain Edwards and the plane.

== Noted Belmontesi ==
- Michele Bianchi, involved with the March on Rome
- Luigi Mattei, Marquis de Belmonte during the 17th century
- Giacinto of Belmonte, Christian Monk, Priest, and Writer

== Main sights ==
- Palazzo Ravaschieri Fieschi della Torre (17th century)
- Castle, erected around 1271
- Collegiate church of Santa Maria Assunta (16th century)
- Church of the Immacolata Concezione (17th century)
- Capuchins' Convent (17th century)
- Palazzo Rivellino (17th century)
- City walls and coastal watchtowers

== Transportation ==
Belmonte can be reached by road through the SS18 State Road (Tirrena Inferiore).

The town has a station on the main line from Naples to Reggio Calabria.
