= Palazzo Rivellino =

Historical building in the municipality of Belmonte Calabro, Calabria, Italy

Palazzo Rivellino, also called Rivellino, is a historical building in the municipality of Belmonte Calabro, in the province of Cosenza, Calabria, southern Italy.

The first nucleus of the palace was built as a coastal tower or fortification in 1579 by Count Torino Ravaschieri Fieschi, to defend those along the coast against enemy attack from the Tyrrhenian Sea. In 1627, the defensive tower was transformed into a palace by Don Orazio Giovan Battista Ravaschieri Fieschi, 1st Prince of Belmonte.

Between 1806 and 1807, the Palace of Rivellino became state property before being sold to the Giuliani family. Currently, the palace is divided between several private owners.

The palace has an inner courtyard, as well as an underground passage that exits into the open air, along the banks of the River Cervella.
