= Lucius Cossinius =

Lucius Cossinius was a Roman praetor who aided Publius Varinius against Spartacus during the Third Servile War. He was aided by his tribune Lucius Furius and the quaestor Gaius Toranius.

== Film Portrayals ==
Cossinius was portrayed by John Wraight in the Starz original series Spartacus: War of the Damned.
