= Lavagna =

- Comune
- Città di Lavagna

- Coat of arms

- Location within Italy Location within Liguria
- Coordinates: 44°19′N 09°20′E
- Country: Italy
- Region: Liguria
- Metropolitan city: Genoa (GE)
- Frazioni: Barassi, Cavi di Lavagna, Santa Giulia di Centaura, Sorlana

Government
  - Mayor: Gian Alberto Mangiante

Area
  - Total: 13.7 km^{2} (5.3 sq mi)
- Elevation: 6 m (20 ft)

Population (30 September 2012)
  - Total: 12,510
  - Density: 913/km^{2} (2,370/sq mi)
- Demonym: Lavagnesi
- Time zone: UTC+1 (CET)
  - Summer (DST): UTC+2 (CEST)
- Postal code: 16033
- Dialing code: 0185
- Patron saint: Madonna del Carmine
- Saint day: 16 July
- Website: Official website

Lavagna is a comune (municipality) in the Metropolitan City of Genoa, in the Italian region of Liguria.

== History and culture ==
The village, unlike nearby Chiavari which has pre-Roman evidence, seems to have developed in Roman times with the Latin name of Lavania. The name has remained unchanged, over the centuries, until it became the current toponym of Lavagna in the following centuries.

Since 1198 it was a fief of the Fieschi family, who used Lavagna as their stronghold in the numerous inner struggles of the Republic of Genoa.

In 1564 it was sacked by the admiral of the Ottoman fleet Occhiali. From 1815 it was part of the Kingdom of Sardinia and, later, of the Kingdom of Italy.

The city recreates medieval festivities annually as the Torta dei Fieschi ("Fieschi Cake Party"), since 1949, the festivities is about a colorful parade through the Lavagna streets that reunites the inhabitants of the six medieval quarters of Lavagna, as the gigantic cake is distributed among those in the crowd who have found the matching half of their tickets.

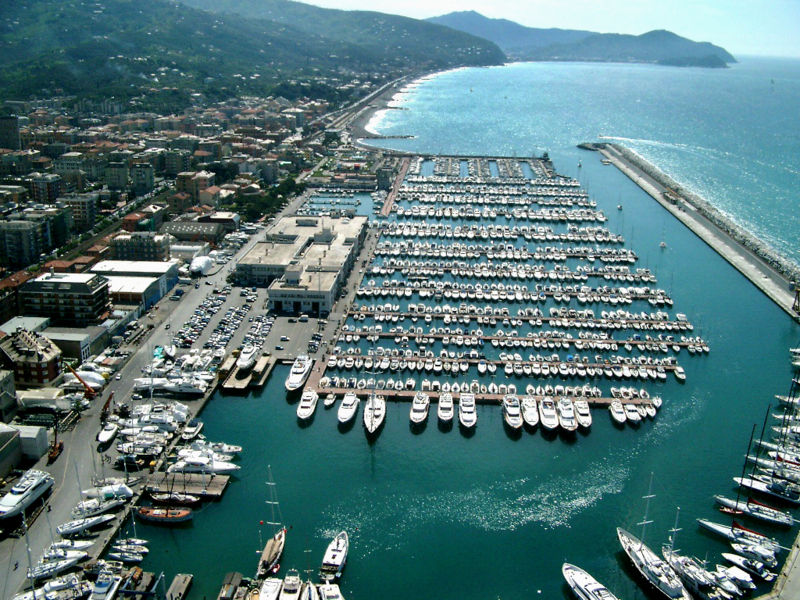
The Port of Lavagna

The main city sights of Lavagna are: Church of Santo Stefano (17th century style), Church of Santa Giulia (1654), Church of Nostra Signora del Ponte (13th century), with the nearby bridge.

== Controversies ==
In 2016, Giuseppe Sanguineti, the former mayor of Lavagna, was arrested due to the involvement of 'Ndrangheta, the Calabrian mafia, in the disposal of the municipal waste.

== Notable people ==
- Fieschi family
- Fanny Cadeo (1970), actress and showgirl
