= 72 BC =

72 BC in various calendars
- Gregorian calendar: 72 BC; LXXII BC
- Ab urbe condita: 682
- Ancient Egypt era: XXXIII dynasty, 252
- Pharaoh: Ptolemy XII Auletes, 9
- Ancient Greek Olympiad (summer): 177th Olympiad (victor)¹
- Assyrian calendar: 4679
- Balinese saka calendar: N/A
- Bengali calendar: −665 – −664
- Berber calendar: 879
- Buddhist calendar: 473
- Burmese calendar: −709
- Byzantine calendar: 5437–5438
- Chinese calendar: 戊申年 (Earth Monkey); 2626 or 2419 — to — 己酉年 (Earth Rooster); 2627 or 2420
- Coptic calendar: −355 – −354
- Discordian calendar: 1095
- Ethiopian calendar: −79 – −78
- Hebrew calendar: 3689–3690
- Hindu calendars
- Vikram Samvat: −15 – −14
- Shaka Samvat: N/A
- Kali Yuga: 3029–3030
- Holocene calendar: 9929
- Iranian calendar: 693 BP – 692 BP
- Islamic calendar: 714 BH – 713 BH
- Javanese calendar: N/A
- Julian calendar: N/A
- Korean calendar: 2262
- Minguo calendar: 1983 before ROC 民前1983年
- Nanakshahi calendar: −1539
- Seleucid era: 240/241 AG
- Thai solar calendar: 471–472
- Tibetan calendar: ས་ཕོ་སྤྲེ་ལོ་ (male Earth-Monkey); 55 or −326 or −1098 — to — ས་མོ་བྱ་ལོ་ (female Earth-Bird); 56 or −325 or −1097

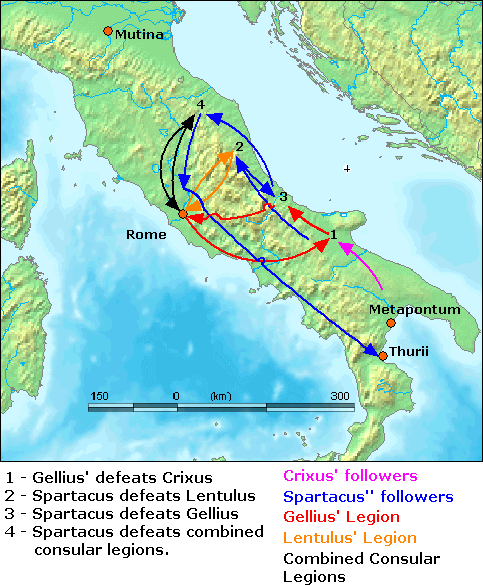
Map of Spartacus's movements of 72 BC, according to Appian's version.

Year 72 BC was a year of the pre-Julian Roman calendar. At the time it was known as the Year of the Consulship of Publicola and Lentulus (or, less frequently, year 682 Ab urbe condita). The denomination 72 BC for this year has been used since the early medieval period, when the Anno Domini calendar era became the prevalent method in Europe for naming years

== Events ==
=== By place ===
==== Roman Republic ====
- Third Servile War: Spartacus moves with his followers northward to the Po Valley. Roman forces under Lucius Gellius Publicola defeat a group of slaves (30,000 men) led by Crixus near Mount Gargano. He kills two-thirds of the rebels, including Crixus himself.
- Summer – Spartacus and his followers defeat the Roman forces under Gnaeus Cornelius Lentulus Clodianus and Gellius, forcing the Roman legions to retreat in disarray. Both consuls are recalled to Rome in disgrace and relieved of their duties.
- Spartacus moves north again, to cross the Alps into Gaul and then to Thracia. Outside Mutina on the plain of the River Po he defeats the Roman forces under Gaius Cassius Longinus, governor of Gallia Cisalpina.
- Autumn – Spartacus and his followers withdraw to the Bruttium peninsula. At one juncture he contemplates attacking Rome – but moves south. The Senate sends Marcus Licinius Crassus against Spartacus.
- Winter – Spartacus decides to camp near Thurii. Marcus Licinius Crassus with ten Roman legions tries to trap the rebels in the toe of Italy. He builds a trench and a low earth rampart (with a fortified palisade).
- Battle of Cabira: Lucius Lucullus defeats King Mithridates VI and overruns Pontus. Mithridates flees to Armenia, ruled by his son-in-law Tigranes, who refuses to turn his father-in-law in to Lucius Lucullus.
- On the Iberian Peninsula (part of the Roman Republic) rebel leader Quintus Sertorius is assassinated by some of his own lieutenants (led by Marcus Perperna). (Note: the year of his assassination is disputed – the debate is whether he was assassinated in 73 or 72 BCE) Perperna takes command of the rebel army.
- Perperna is defeated by Pompey the Great at the Battle of Osca, ending the Sertorian War in Spain.

==== Europe ====
- The Suebi and other tribes under King Ariovistus invade Gaul.

== Deaths ==
- Crixus, Gaulish gladiator and military leader
- Quintus Sertorius, leader of the Sertorian rebels during the Sertorian War
- Marcus Perperna Vento, lieutenant of Quintus Sertorius during the Sertorian War
