= Gaius Manilius =

Roman politician, supporter of Pompey

Gaius Manilius was a Roman tribune of the plebs in 66 BC. He is primarily known for his Lex Manilia, the bill which gave Pompey the Great command of the war against Mithridates.

== Career ==
=== Freedmen Bill ===
At the beginning of his year of office as tribune (Dec. 67), he succeeded in getting a law passed (de libertinorum suffragiis), which gave freedmen the privilege of voting together with those who had manumitted them (i.e. in the same tribe as their patronus). However, this law was almost immediately declared null and void by the Senate.

=== Mithridatic War and lex Manilia ===
Later in the year 66 BC, Manilius proposed a bill, the lex Manilia, granting Pompey the command in the Third Mithridatic War. From 73 to 68 BC, Lucius Licinius Lucullus had achieved considerable success in the East, defeating both Mithridates VI of Pontus and his ally Tigranes the Great. However, Lucullus' troops mutinied under the leadership of Publius Clodius Pulcher in 67 BC, allowing Mithridates and Tigranes to invade Pontus and Cappadocia once more. Lucullus' immediate replacement, Manius Acilius Glabrio, was ineffective, and by the end of 67 BC Mithridates had recovered all of his former kingdom

Manilius' bill recalled all three of the generals still in the East (Lucullus in Pontus, Glabrio in Bithynia, and Quintus Marcius Rex in Cilicia). It transferred their commands and the entire conduct of the eastern war to Pompey, who was already in the East completing his campaign against the pirates (as granted by the lex Gabinia of 67 BC).

Manilius' bill was opposed by Quintus Hortensius and Quintus Lutatius Catulus. Crucially, however, it was supported by several eminent ex-consuls (unlike the lex Gabinia, which had been almost universally opposed by the Senate), as a result of which it passed unanimously in the comitia tributa. These ex-consuls included Servilius Vatia Isauricus, Gaius Scribonius Curio, Gaius Cassius Longinus, and Gnaeus Cornelius Lentulus Clodianus. It was also supported by Cicero, at the time serving as praetor, in his extant speech pro lege Manilia (also known as de Imperio Cn. Pompei).

Pompey soon moved against Mithridates and Tigranes and had defeated both by the end of 65 BC (though Mithridates was not killed until 63 BC).

=== Trial and Exile ===
Manilius was prosecuted twice upon leaving his office in December 66 BC, though a lack of source material makes details uncertain. It seems he was defended by Cicero from an initial charge of extortion (de repetundis), but that the trial was dropped amid violence and disturbances. However, Manilius was prosecuted again on a charge of maiestas: since he is never mentioned again in the source material, it appears he was found guilty and exiled.
