= Lentulus =

Lentulus may refer to:

- Gnaeus Cornelius Lentulus Clodianus, Roman senator and commander against Spartacus
- Publius Cornelius Lentulus Sura, Roman senator and Catilinarian conspirator
- Publius Cornelius Lentulus Spinther, Roman senator
- Lucius Cornelius Lentulus Crus, Roman senator and opponent of Julius Caesar
- Gnaeus Cornelius Lentulus Gaetulicus (consul 26), Roman senator, executed by the emperor Caligula
- Publius Lentulus, apocryphal Roman official, supposedly the author of an epistle describing Jesus

== See also ==
- Cornelii Lentuli
