= Gaius Cornelius Cethegus (conspirator) =

Roman politician

Gaius Cornelius Cethegus (died 63 BC) was a Roman senator and politician who participated in the second Catilinarian conspiracy of June 64 BC.

== Life ==
Despite coming from the illustrious Cornelia gens, he had a mediocre political career.

Like many other youthful profligates, he joined Catiline's conspiracy in the hope of getting his debts cancelled. When Catiline left Rome in 63 BC, Cethegus remained behind as leader of the conspirators with Publius Cornelius Lentulus Sura. He himself undertook to murder Cicero and other prominent men, but was hampered by the dilatoriness of Sura, whose age and rank entitled him to the chief consideration.

On 3 December 63 BC, the consul Cicero made public several letters from the conspirators inciting the Gallic Allobroges to revolt. One of these had been written and signed by Cethegus, implicating him beyond doubt. He was arrested and moved to the Temple of Concord, then put under house arrest in the home of a trusted senator, Quintus Cornificius. Cicero's allies discovered a cache of swords and daggers in Cethegus' house meant for the conspirators' use. A debate in the Senate as to whether to execute the conspirators ended in the decision to do so; and Cethegus and the others were strangled in the Tullianum prison on 4 December.
