= Battle of the Silarius River =

Last battle of the Roman Servile War, 71 BC

Coordinates: 40°28′53.861″N 14°56′33.112″E

- Part of the Third Servile War
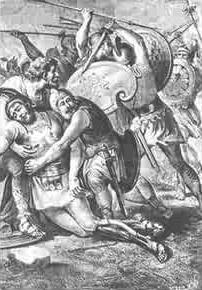
Date	71 BC
Location	Near Sele River, Italy
Result	Roman victory

Belligerents
Roman Republic	Slave army

Commanders and leaders
Marcus Licinius Crassus	Spartacus (PKIA)

Strength
40,000; 6 legions 4 consular legions	50,000

Casualties and losses
1,000 or more	5,000–10,000 killed

The Battle of the Silarius River was the final, decisive action of the Third Servile War, the last of the Roman Servile Wars. It occurred near the mouth of modern Sele River, southern Campania, southern Italy.

== Background ==
Marcus Licinius Crassus trapped Spartacus in Bruttium by building a 60-kilometre-long (37 mi) system of ditches and walls. After a failed truce, Spartacus gathered his army for battle. He ordered his horse to be brought to him, drew his sword, and slew the animal. He proclaimed to his troops that if he should win the day, he would have many horses to choose from, but if he should lose the upcoming battle and the Romans should win the day, he would not need one.

Appian wrote that Spartacus then launched several skirmishing assaults upon the Roman defenders, striking them swiftly and almost with silence. After slaying a number of the Roman guards and penetrating the Roman defenses, Spartacus and about 50,000 rebels managed to slip past Crassus' defenses, while Gannicus and Castus remained behind with the remaining 12,000 soldiers of the rebel army.

== Battle ==
On the banks of the Sele River, Spartacus' army finally met the Roman legions of Crassus on the open battlefield. The gladiators charged at the Roman ranks, colliding with a wall of shields and swords. Though the rebels fought hard and took down many Roman soldiers, they also suffered heavy casualties in the process. Spartacus rallied his troops and led an advance against Crassus.

In the midst of the battle, Spartacus tried desperately to reach Crassus, killing two centurions in the process. Appian wrote that during the battle, Spartacus was severely wounded in the leg by a javelin and was forced to get down on his knees. Despite his injury, the rebel leader refused to give up and continued fighting before he was finally overpowered and killed.

The rebels fought desperately for a long time but were eventually cut down in droves with many fleeing to the mountains.

== Aftermath ==
At the end of the battle, Crassus and his men were victorious, though they too had suffered some heavy casualties. According to Appian, the numbers of dead on both sides were extremely high and impossible to count. Appian noted in his sources that only about 1,000 Roman soldiers fell in the battle, but other historians like Barry S. Strauss believe Roman losses were much higher.

Spartacus also died in the battle, but his body was never recovered. An ancient source estimated 40,000 rebels killed, but Strauss in 2009 suggested between 5,000 and 10,000 dead. Six thousand survivors of the revolt were captured and crucified on Crassus' orders, while 5,000 others who escaped from Crassus' troops were captured and killed by the Spanish legions under Pompey, possibly in northern Italy.
