= Lex Manilia =

Ancient Roman law

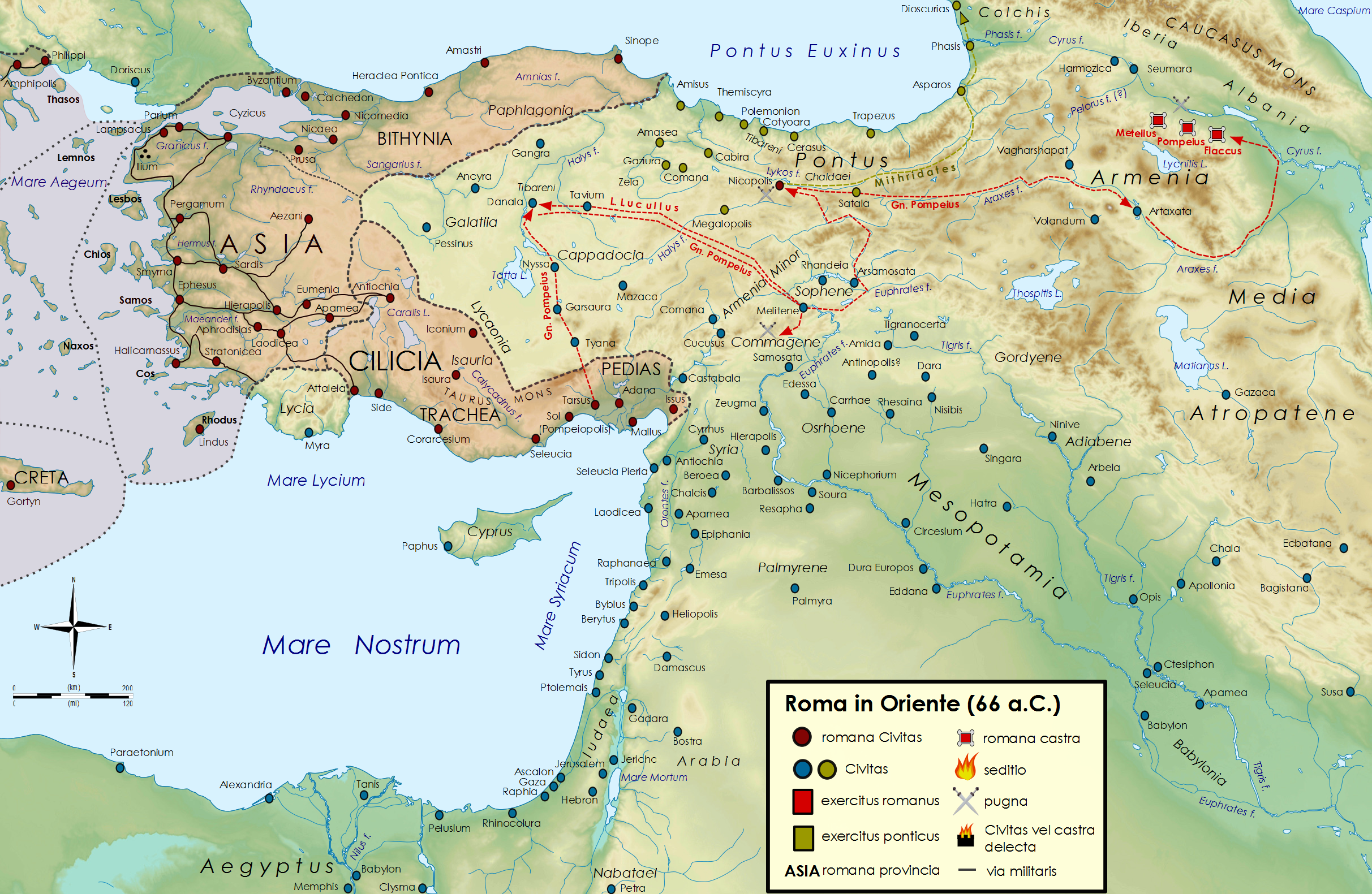
Military situation in the Near East as of 66 BC

The lex Manilia (Law of Manilius) was a Roman law passed in 66 BC granting Pompey the military command in the East against Mithridates VI of Pontus.

== Background ==
Previously, the war against Mithridates (commonly known as the Third Mithridatic War) had been conducted by Lucius Licinius Lucullus. By the winter of 68–7 BC, Lucullus had ejected Mithridates from his kingdom of Pontus and had invaded the Armenian empire of Mithridates' ally, Tigranes the Great.

However, Lucullus was forced to halt his advances when his discontented legions (the 'Fimbrian Legions', many of whom who had been in the East since the command of Gaius Flavius Fimbria in 86 BC) mutinied under the leadership of Publius Clodius Pulcher. Mithridates and Tigranes took advantage and renewed their offensives, Mithridates invading Pontus while Tigranes invaded Cappadocia. Mithridates inflicted a crushing defeat on Roman forces under Lucullus' legate Triarius at the Battle of Zela in summer 67 BC.

Lucullus was promptly superseded in the command against Mithridates by the consul for 67 BC, Manius Acilius Glabrio, though Lucullus remained in the East for a while nonetheless. However Glabrio, realising the difficulty of the situation, lingered in Bithynia, allowing Mithridates to recover the whole of his former kingdom by the end of 67 BC.

== lex Manilia ==
The law, proposed in 66 BC by the tribune Gaius Manilius in response to the escalating crisis in Asia Minor, recalled the three commanders presently in the East (Lucullus in Pontus, Glabrio in Bithynia, and Quintus Marcius Rex in Cilicia). It granted all their legions and the entire conduct of the eastern war to Pompey, who was conveniently already present in the East completing his command against the pirates (as granted to him by the lex Gabinia of 67 BC).

Unlike the lex Gabinia of the previous year, which had been almost universally opposed in the Senate, Manilius' proposal was supported by many senators and several eminent ex-consuls. These included Publius Servilius Vatia Isauricus (consul 79 BC), Gaius Scribonius Curio, Gaius Cassius Longinus Varus (consul 73 BC), and Gnaeus Cornelius Lentulus Clodianus (consul 72 BC). The proposal was also supported by Cicero, at the time serving as praetor, in his extant speech De Imperio Cn. Pompei. Opposition to the law was largely confined to Quintus Hortensius and Quintus Lutatius Catulus, whose arguments against granting Pompey the command are addressed at length by Cicero in his speech.

== Aftermath ==
Manilius' law was passed in the Comitia Tributa without any of the violence that had occurred the year before with Gabinius' proposal. Pompey soon moved against Mithridates and Tigranes, and had defeated both by the end of 65 BC (though Mithridates was not killed until 63 BC).

As for Manilius, he was prosecuted twice upon leaving his office in December 66 BC. On the first occasion, he was defended from a charge of extortion (de repetundis) by Cicero, but the charges were dropped in January 65 BC amid disturbances and violence. However, on the second occasion he was condemned on the charge of maiestas and exiled.

== See also ==
- Roman law
- List of Roman laws
