= De Imperio Cn. Pompei =

Speech of Cicero

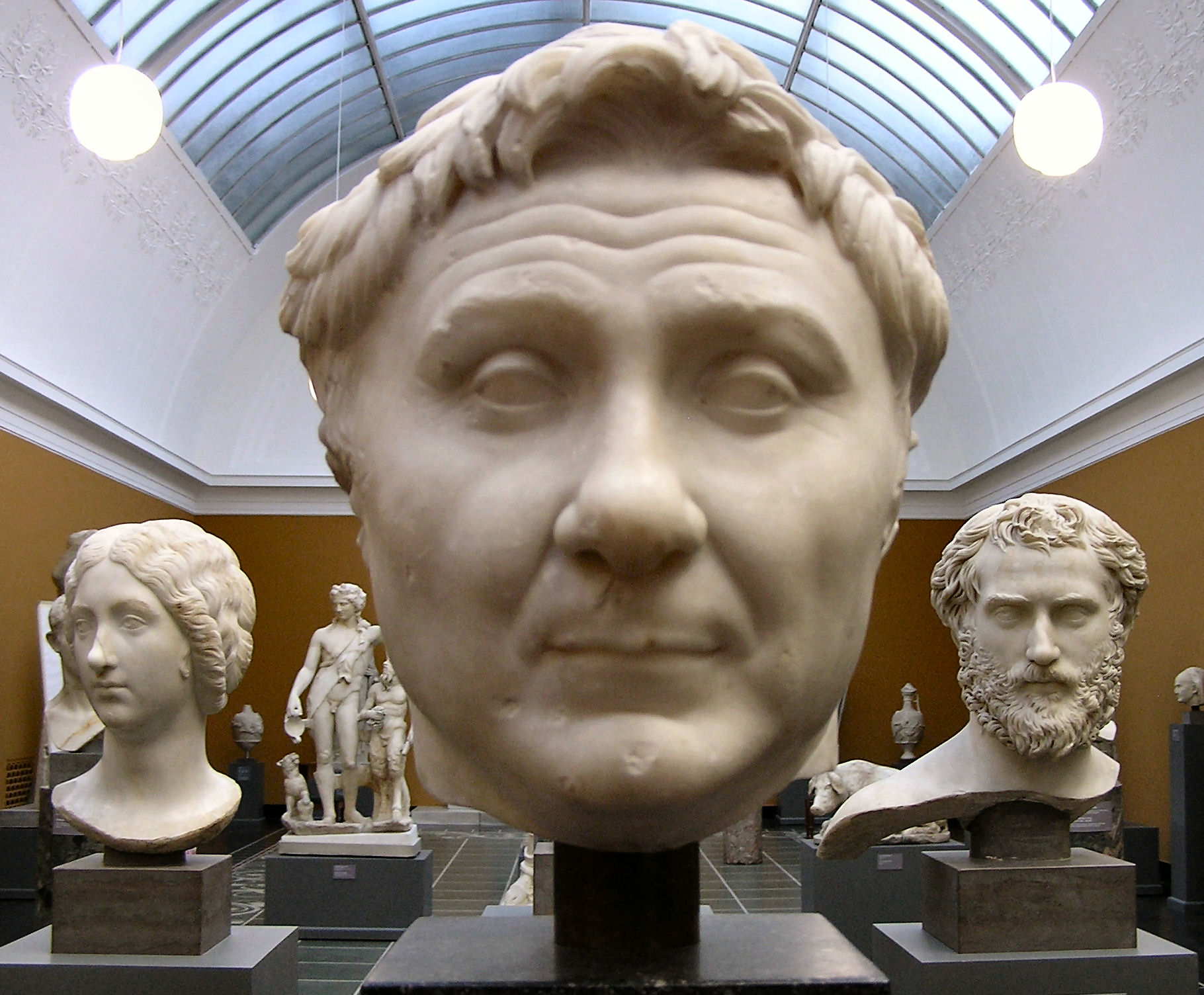
Portrait of Pompey the Great

De Imperio Cn. Pompei ("On the Imperium of Gnaeus Pompeius"), also known as Pro Lege Manilia ("In Favour of the Manilian Law"), was a speech delivered by Cicero in 66 BC before the Roman popular assembly. It was in support of the proposal made by Gaius Manilius, a tribune of the people, that Pompey the Great be given sole command against Mithridates in the Third Mithridatic War.

Cicero advertised Pompey as the only man with the skills for the campaign but also attempted to avoid offending the senatorial aristocracy unnecessarily. However, by supporting Pompey, Cicero had publicly committed himself.
