= Publius Cornelius Lentulus Sura =

Roman consul in 71 BC

- Born: 114 BC
- Died: 5 December 63 BC
- Known for: step-father of Mark Antony
- Office: Quaestor (81 BC); Praetor (74 BC); Consul (71 BC); Praetor (63 BC)
- Spouse: Julia

Publius Cornelius Lentulus Sura (114 BC – 5 December 63 BC) was one of the chief figures in the Catilinarian conspiracy. He was also the step-father of the future triumvir Mark Antony.

== Biography ==
When accused by Sulla (to whom he had been quaestor in 81 BC) of having squandered the public money, he refused to render any account, but insolently held out the calf of his leg (sura), on which part of the person boys were punished when they made mistakes in playing ball, akin to inviting a slap on the wrist. He was praetor in 74 BC, serving as president of the quaestio de repetundis, before being elected as consul in 71 BC.

In 70, he was one of a number of senators expelled from the senate for immorality. He was elected as one of the praetors for 63, readmitting him to the senate. However, soon after his election to praetor, he joined Catiline's conspiracy. Relying upon a Sibylline oracle that three Cornelii should be rulers of Rome, Lentulus regarded himself as the destined successor of Lucius Cornelius Sulla and Lucius Cornelius Cinna. When Catiline left Rome after Cicero's second speech In Catilinam, Lentulus took his place as chief of the conspirators in the city. In conjunction with Gaius Cornelius Cethegus, he undertook to murder Cicero and set fire to Rome, but the plot failed owing to his timidity and indiscretion.

On learning that ambassadors from the Allobroges were in Rome bearing a complaint against their oppression by Roman provincial governors, Lentulus made overtures to them with the object of obtaining armed assistance. Pretending to fall in with his views, the ambassadors obtained a written agreement signed by the chief conspirators, and informed Q. Fabius Sanga, their "patron" in Rome, who in turn informed Cicero.

The conspirators were arrested and forced to admit their guilt. He was put to death in the Tullianum on 5 December 63 BC, along with other senatorial supporters of Catiline.

== See also ==
- Lentulus, Roman patrician family.

Preceded by Lucius Gellius; Gn. Cornelius Lentulus Clodianus	Roman consul 71 BC; With: Gnaeus Aufidius Orestes	Succeeded by Pompey; M. Licinius Crassus
