= Marcus Terentius Varro Lucullus =

Roman senator and general

- Born: Marcus Licinius Lucullus; 116 BC
- Died: soon after 56 BC
- Office: Consul (73 BC); Governor of Macedonia (72 BC)
- Father: Lucius Lucullus

Marcus Terentius Varro Lucullus (116 – soon after 56 BC), younger brother of the more famous Lucius Licinius Lucullus, was a supporter of Lucius Cornelius Sulla and consul of ancient Rome in 73 BC. As proconsul of Macedonia in 72 BC, he defeated the Bessi in Thrace and advanced to the Danube and the west coast of the Black Sea. In addition, he was marginally involved in the Third Servile War (a.k.a. Spartacus' War).

== Biography ==
=== Name and family ===
Born in Rome as Marcus Licinius Lucullus, he was later adopted by an otherwise unknown Marcus Terentius Varro (not the scholar Varro Reatinus). As a result of the adoption, his full official name, as quoted in inscriptions, became M(arcus) Terentius M(arci) f(ilius) Varro Lucullus. Literary texts usually refer to him as M. Lucullus or simply Lucullus which in the case of Appian, Civil Wars 1.120, for example, caused confusion with Marcus' more famous brother, Lucius Licinius Lucullus.

=== First public activities ===
In the early 90s BC, young Marcus and his brother Lucius unsuccessfully prosecuted Servilius the Augur. This man had earlier functioned as the prosecutor in the trial for embezzlement (de repetundis) that sent their father, Lucius Licinius Lucullus into exile to Lucania.

=== Service under Sulla ===
When Sulla returned from the East in the spring of 83 BC to fight the Marians, Marcus Lucullus, like his brother Lucius, joined Sulla's forces. He served under his cousin, the propraetor Quintus Caecilius Metellus Pius, as a legatus in Northern Italy. At first, Marcus Lucullus was forced to retreat into the small town of Placentia, but once Metellus defeated the superior troops of the Marian general Gaius Norbanus, Marcus Lucullus broke the siege and defeated a detachment left behind by Norbanus. At Fidentia, he commanded 15 cohorts (c. 3,600 men) and managed to defeat a superior force of 50 cohorts (12,000 men) under Gnaeus Papirius Carbo’s legate Quinctius of which his troops killed 1,800 men.

=== Priesthood ===
Probably at the suggestion of his first cousin, the Pontifex Maximus Quintus Caecilius Metellus Pius, Marcus Lucullus was nominated for and elected to the Pontifical College. This may have happened when Sulla expanded the Pontifical College from 9 to 15 members in 81 BC. Membership in one of the four major priestly colleges was an honor that was considered almost equal to winning a consulship, and it boded well for Marcus Lucullus' future career.

=== Aedileship ===
Even though he was not even present at the elections of 80 BC, Marcus Lucullus was elected to serve as curule aedile for 79 BC together with his older brother Lucius Licinius Lucullus, who had recently returned from the Roman province of Asia. Their aedileship was distinguished by games which Cicero much later still remembered for their splendor. Among other things, the brothers introduced revolving backdrops for the temporary stage that they had built for theatrical performances. Moreover, they were the first to pit an elephant against a steer in the arena.

=== Judge ===
Elected praetor peregrinus, the praetor in charge of court cases involving non-Roman citizens, for 76 BC, Marcus Lucullus presided over one cause célèbre, the trial against Gaius Antonius Hybrida (later Cicero's colleague as consul). Antonius had enriched himself shamelessly as a legate of Sulla in Greece during the First Mithridatic War. The prosecutor, the young Julius Caesar, won a conviction. Antonius managed, however, to have his conviction overturned by appealing to the people's tribunes. because, as he said, he could not get a fair trial in Rome against a Greek man.

Apart from this, the praetor Marcus Lucullus is credited with an edict against armed gangs of slaves that authorized victims to demand compensation of four times the amount of their damages from the slaves' owners.

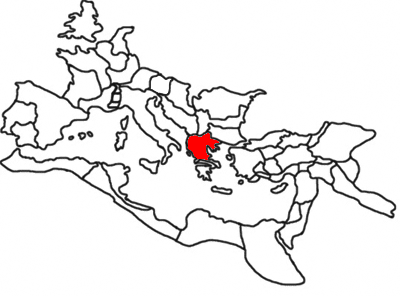
Macedonia province within the Roman Empire, c. 120.

=== Consul and governor of Macedonia ===
As consul in 73 BC (along with Gaius Cassius Longinus), he passed a law that provided subsidized grain for indigent Roman citizens (lex Terentia et Cassia frumentaria). His name also appears on a famous inscription (IG VII, 413), a letter that informs the inhabitants of Oropus in Greece that the senate has passed a decree in their favour regarding their dispute with Roman tax farmers.

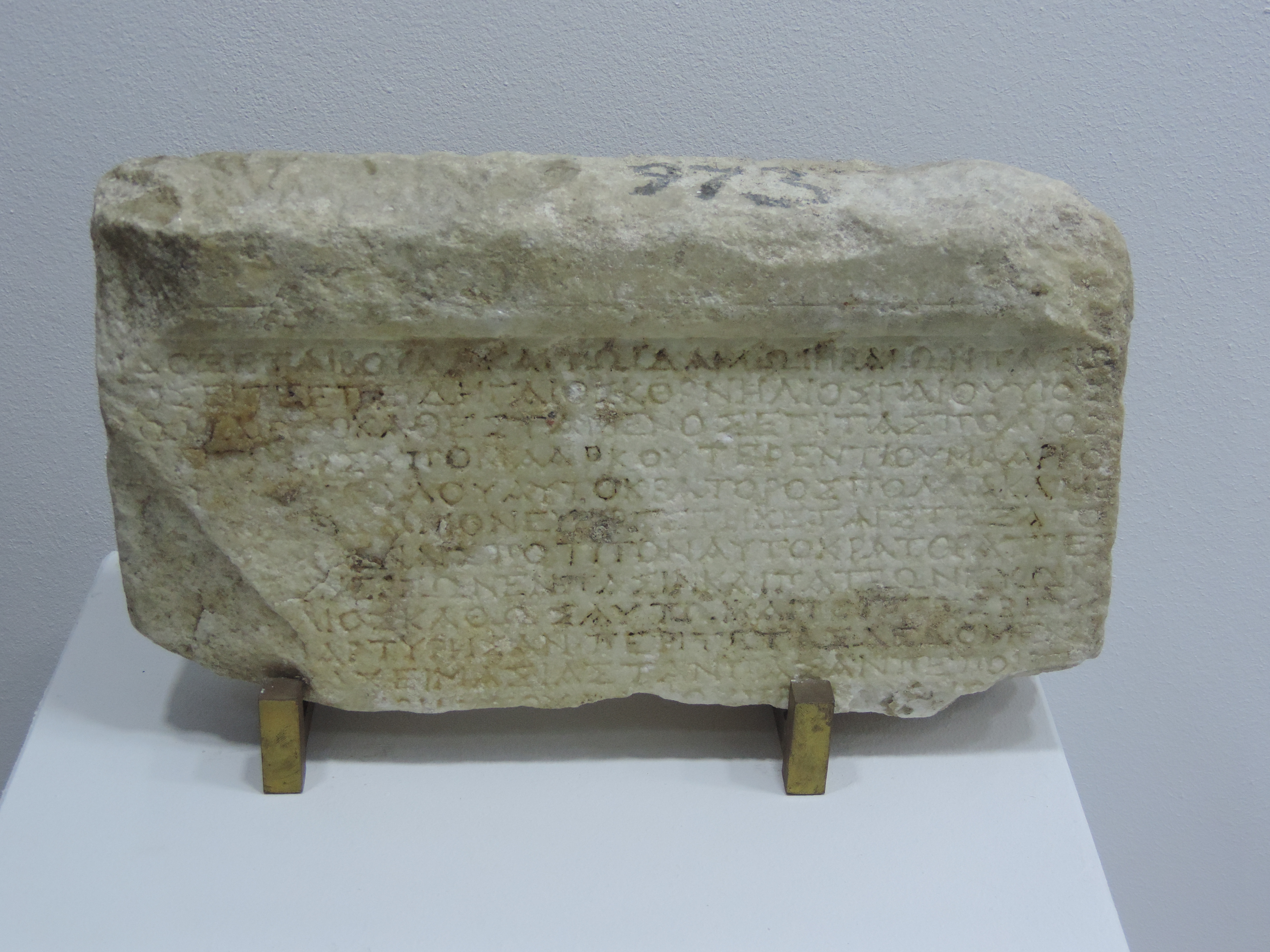
Marble slab telling about the conquest of Marcus Terentius Varro Lucullus against the western Black Sea Greek provinces, 1st century BC. Exhibit of Burgas Archaeological Museum

After his consulship, Marcus Lucullus became governor (proconsul) of the important province of Macedonia. He used his tenure to lead a successful campaign against a neighboring tribe, the Thracian Bessi. In the course of this war, he advanced to the Danube and the west coast of the Black Sea where he conquered a number of Greek cities that had been bases of Mithridates VI The Great, including Apollonia, Kallatis (Callatis), Tomi, and Istros. For these achievements, he was awarded a triumph which he held in 71 BC. Part of the booty from this campaign was a colossal statue of Apollo that Marcus Lucullus took from a temple on an island near Apollonia. It may have been on the occasion of his triumph that he set it up in the Temple of Jupiter Optimus Maximus.

Earlier in the same year, 71 BC, Marcus Lucullus also played a minor role in the defeat of Spartacus' slave army. He was prematurely recalled from his post in Macedonia in order to assist with the suppression of the rebellious slaves. At the time, Spartacus had just managed to force his way through Crassus' troops that had him cornered near Rhegium, across from Sicily, and made his way to Brundisium, across from Greece, presumably to sail from there to Greece or Illyrium. Yet when he received the news that Marcus Lucullus and his troops had already landed in Brundisium, he turned around and faced Crassus' pursuing army for the final and decisive battle of the war.

=== Later life and death ===
In 70 BC, Marcus Lucullus helped Cicero achieve his famous prosecution of Verres by appearing as a witness for the prosecution (as did his consular colleague from 73, Gaius Cassius Longinus Varus, among others).

In 66 or 65 BC, Marcus Lucullus was put on trial by Gaius Memmius for his activities under Sulla but acquitted. In 65, he spoke as one of the witnesses for the prosecution in the maiestas trial against the former people's tribune Gaius Cornelius whom the nobility considered a revolutionary; Cornelius was defended by Cicero.

In 63 BC, Marcus Lucullus opposed the attempt of Catilina to kill the consuls, among them Cicero, and overthrow the government. In the following year, he served as the main witness for the defense in the trial against his friend, the poet Licinius Archias, in which Cicero gave his famous speech in defense of Archias' claims to Roman citizenship. Later, in 58 and 57 BC, Marcus Lucullus belonged to the group that worked behind the scenes to enable Cicero's return from exile. When his brother, Lucius Lucullus, lost his mental powers, Marcus Lucullus became his legal guardian; he buried him at his Tusculan estate in 56 BC. Marcus Lucullus himself died not long after.

== See also ==
- Lucullus
- Licinia gens

== Sources ==
=== Ancient sources ===
- Appian, The Civil Wars 1.92 and 120.
- Asconius, Commentary on Cicero's In Toga Candida p. 84 Clark.
- Cicero, "Pro Tullio" 8–11.
- Corpus Inscriptionum Latinarum I^{2}.719 = 11.6331.
- Eutropius 6.10.1.
- Inscriptiones Graecae VII 413.
- Livy, Periochae 88.
- Pliny, Naturalis Historia 4.92 and 34.38
- Plutarch, Lucullus 1, 37, and 43; Caesar 4.
- Quintus Cicero, Commentariolum Petitionis 8.
- Sallust, Histories 4.18 M.
- Strabo, Geography 7.6.1.

=== Secondary literature ===
- Arkenberg, J. S. "Licinii Murenae, Terentii Varrones, and Varrones Murenae." Historia 42 (1993) 326–51.
- Bradley, Keith. Slavery and Rebellion in the Roman World. Bloomington: Indiana University Press, 1989. ISBN 0-253-31259-0
- Broughton, T. Robert S. "Magistrates of the Roman Republic." Vol. 2. Cleveland: Case Western University Press, 1968, p. 118-19.
- Gelzer, Matthias. Cicero. Ein biographischer Versuch. Wiesbaden: Franz Steiner Verlag, 1969 (repr. 1983). ISBN 3-515-04089-7.
- Gelzer, Matthias. Caesar. Der Politiker und Staatsmann. 6th ed. Wiesbaden: Franz Steiner Verlag, 1960 (repr. 1983). ISBN 3-515-03907-4.
- Keaveney, Arthur. Lucullus. A Life. London/New York: Routledge, 1992. ISBN 0-415-03219-9.
- Mommsen, Theodor, "The History of Rome, Books I-V", project Gutenberg electronic edition, 2004. ISBN 0-415-14953-3.
- Strachan-Davidson, J. L. (ed.), Appian, Civil Wars: Book I, Oxford 1902.
- Sumner, G.V. (1973). The Orators in Cicero's Brutus: Prosopography and Chronology. University of Toronto Press. ISBN 0-8020-5281-9.
- Taylor, Lily Ross. "Caesar's Colleagues in the Pontifical College." American Journal of Philology 63 (1942) 385–412.
- Ward, Allen M. "Politics in the Trials of Manilius and Cornelius." Transactions and Proceedings of the American Philological Association 101 (1970), pp. 545–556.

| Preceded by L. Licinius Lucullus; M. Aurelius Cotta | Roman consul 73 BC; With: Gaius Cassius Longinus | Succeeded by Lucius Gellius; Gn. Cornelius Lentulus Clodianus |
