= Gaius Cassius Longinus (consul 73 BC) =

Roman senator and general

Consul of the Roman Republic
- In office 73 BC – 73 BC Serving with Marcus Terentius Varro Lucullus
- Preceded by: Gaius Aurelius Cotta and Lucius Octavius
- Succeeded by: Gnaeus Octavius and Gaius Scribonius Curio

Personal details
- Parent: Possibly father of Gaius Cassius Longinus (Caesar's assassin)
- Known for: Defeat by Spartacus during the Third Servile War; supporter of the Lex Manilia

Military service
- Commands: Proconsul of Cisalpine Gaul

Gaius Cassius Longinus was a Roman consul in 73 BC (together with Marcus Terentius Varro Lucullus).

Cassius and his colleague passed the lex Terentia Cassia that ordered the state to buy up grain in Sicily and sell it for a low price in Rome. As proconsul of Cisalpine Gaul in the next year, 72 BC, during the Third Servile War, Cassius tried to stop Spartacus and his followers near Mutina (Modena) as the slave army was trying to break through to unoccupied Gaul, but suffered defeat and barely managed to get away alive. Two years later, Cassius appeared as a witness for the prosecution, which was being led by Cicero, in the trial against the corrupt former governor of Sicily, Verres. In 66 BC, Cassius supported the Manilian law that gave command of the war against Mithridates to Pompey; he was joined in this by Cicero, then praetor, whose famous speech in support of the same bill survives.

This Cassius Longinus may have been the father of the more famous assassin of Caesar, Gaius Cassius Longinus.

== Bibliography ==
- Broughton, T. Robert S. Magistrates of the Roman Republic, vol. 2. Cleveland: Case Western University Press, 1968, p. 109 and 117.
- Bradley, Keith. Slavery and Rebellion in the Roman World. Bloomington: Indiana University Press, 1989, p. 96. ISBN 0-253-31259-0
- Münzer, Friedrich, "Cassius 58", Realencyclopädie der classischen Altertumswissenschaft (RE, PW), volume III.2, column 1727 (Stuttgart, 1899).

== Selected ancient Sources ==
- Livy, Periochae 96.
- Plutarch, Crassus 9.7.
- Florus, Epitome 2.8.10.
- Orosius 5.24.4. (Some of these sources are available in English translation from the Internet Ancient History Sourcebook (http://www.fordham.edu/halsall/ancient/3slaverevolttexts.htm).)
- Appian, Civil Wars 1.117.

Political offices
Preceded by L. Licinius Lucullus; M. Aurelius Cotta	Consul of the Roman Republic; 73 BC; With: M. Terentius Varro Lucullus	Succeeded by L. Gellius; Gn. Cornelius Lentulus Clodianus
