= Lucius Gellius =

Roman general and politician (c. 136 BC–c. 54 BC)

Lucius Gellius (c. 136 BC – c. 54 BC) was a Roman politician and general who was one of two consuls of the Republic in 72 BC, along with Gnaeus Cornelius Lentulus Clodianus. A supporter of Pompey, he is noted for being one of the consular generals who led Roman legions against the slave armies of Spartacus in the Third Servile War.

== Early career and the Third Servile War ==
The first member of the Gellii to achieve the consulate, at an early age Lucius was attached to Gaius Papirius Carbo as his contubernalis. He began his climb up the cursus honorum with his election as quaestor around 102 BC followed by aedile around 96 BC. This was followed by his election as Praetor Peregrinus in 94 BC, after which he was posted as propraetor to the province of Asia in the following year. Stopping in Athens on his was to take up his position in Asia, Cicero claims he mockingly offered to mediate between the rival Athenian philosophers.

In 89 BC, Gellius was a senior legate under Pompeius Strabo, beginning a long association with that family that would continue with Strabo's son, Pompeius Magnus So much so that when he achieved the consulate in 72 BC, he was noted as a Pompeian consul and pushed through a bill to validate grants of citizenship by Pompey in Hispania. He and his colleague also ensured that no Roman citizen in the provinces could be tried in absentia on a capital charge – an attempt to restrict the ravages of Gaius Verres in Sicily.

However, the major event of his consulship was the revolt of Spartacus and the eruption of the Third Servile War. Having won a number of victories against ill-prepared Roman forces, the Senate now recognised Spartacus as a serious threat and sent both the consuls to confront the slave armies at the head of four legions. Initially successful, Gellius defeated Crixus and 30,000 rebel slaves at Mount Garganus near Apulia, then moved northwards behind Spartacus's forces which were moving north. With Clodianus barring Spartacus in the north, they hoped to catch the rebels between the two armies. Spartacus' slave army destroyed Clodianus' legions, and then turned and defeated the oncoming legions of Gellius. Gathering their shattered forces, both consuls gave chase but were once again defeated at a battle near Picenum.

Humiliated by these defeats, shortly afterward, in early autumn, Gellius and Clodianus were withdrawn as commanders by the Roman Senate, and command of the war given to Marcus Licinius Crassus. This setback to Gellius's career was only temporary; with the support of Pompey, both Gellius and Clodianus were appointed censor in 70 BC. They began a systematic purge of the senate, removing some sixty-four senators, among them a number of individuals connected to the trial of Oppianicus, as well as some important individuals such as Gaius Antonius Hybrida and Publius Cornelius Lentulus Sura. They identified 910,000 citizens and possibly named Mamercus Aemilius Lepidus Livianus as Princeps Senatus.

== Later career ==
By 67 BC, Gellius was serving as a legate with praetorian imperium under Pompey, who had received an extraordinary command to rid the Mediterranean Sea of pirates. Gellius was given charge of the Italian coast off Tuscany. Although Pompey soon headed to the East, Gellius retained command of the fleet near Italy until 63 BC.

Returning to Rome, he gave his support to Cicero, who had swiftly dealt with the Catiline conspiracy, to the point where Gellius declared in the Senate that Cicero deserved the Civic Crown for his services to the state. He continued to give support to the party which soon became known as the Optimates, in 59 BC speaking in opposition of Julius Caesar’s agrarian law, while in 57 BC he spoke in support of Cicero's return from exile.

Gellius was still alive in 55 BC when Cicero delivered his speech against Lucius Calpurnius Piso, but died soon afterwards. His adopted son was Lucius Gellius Publicola, consul in 36 BC.

== See also ==
- Gellia gens

== Sources ==
- T. Robert S. Broughton, The Magistrates of the Roman Republic, Vol II (1952).
- Holmes, T. Rice, The Roman Republic and the Founder of the Empire, Vol. I (1923)
- Syme, Ronald, The Roman Revolution, Clarendon Press, Oxford, 1939.
- Anthon, Charles & Smith, William, A New Classical Dictionary of Greek and Roman Biography, Mythology and Geography (1860).
- Smith, William, ed. (1870). Dictionary of Greek and Roman Biography and Mythology. Vol. 3. Boston: Little, Brown and Company. p. 612 – via Wikisource.

Political offices
Preceded by M. Terentius Varro Lucullus; G. Cassius Longinus	Consul of Rome; 72 BC; With: Gn. Cornelius Lentulus Clodianus	Succeeded by P. Cornelius Lentulus Sura; Gn. Aufidius Orestes
