= Gnaeus Cornelius Lentulus Clodianus =

Roman general and politician

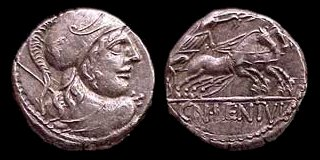

Gnaeus Cornelius Lentulus Clodianus (born 115 BC) was a Roman politician and general who was one of two consuls of the Republic in 72 BC along with Lucius Gellius. Closely linked to the family of Pompey, he is noted for being one of the consular generals who led Roman legions against the slave armies of Spartacus in the Third Servile War.

== Biography ==
Although born into the plebeian Claudii Marcelli family, Clodianus was adopted into the patrician Cornelii Lentuli, possibly as the adoptive son of Gnaeus Cornelius Lentulus. A partisan of Gnaeus Pompeius Magnus, he possibly served under Pompey during Pompey's special commission in Hispania. Elected praetor around 75 BC, his connections with Pompey ensured that he was elected consul in 72 BC .

Clodianus soon was involved in protecting Pompey's interests, pushing a bill to validate grants of citizenship by Pompey in Hispania. He and his colleague also ensured that no Roman citizen in the provinces could be tried in absentia on a capital charge – an attempt to restrict the ravages of Gaius Verres in Sicily. Finally, Clodianus proposed a bill for recovering payment, which Lucius Cornelius Sulla had remitted, from those who had bought the confiscated property of those who suffered under the Sullan proscriptions.

However, the major event of his consulship was the revolt of Spartacus and the eruption of the Third Servile War. Having won a number of victories against ill-prepared Roman forces, the Senate now recognised Spartacus as a serious threat and sent both the consuls to confront the slave armies at the head of four legions. Clodianus moved to block Spartacus's march northward, while his colleague Publicola moved in behind, hoping to catch the rebels between the two armies. However, Spartacus's slave army destroyed Clodianus' legions in the Apennine Mountains (near modern Pistoia) in the valley named Lentula, and then turned and defeated the oncoming legions of Publicola. Gathering their shattered forces, both consuls gave chase but were once again defeated at a battle near Picenum.

Humiliated by these defeats, shortly afterward, in early autumn, Clodianus and Publicola were withdrawn as commanders by the Roman Senate, and command of the war given to Marcus Licinius Crassus.

This setback to Clodianus's career was only temporary; with the support of Pompey, both Clodianus and Publicola were appointed censor in 70 BC. They began a systematic purge of the senate, removing some sixty-four senators, among them a number of individuals connected to the trial of Oppianicus, as well as some important individuals such as Gaius Antonius Hybrida and Publius Cornelius Lentulus Sura. However, the majority of those expelled were acquitted by the courts and restored to their former position. They also identified 910,000 citizens and possibly named Mamercus Aemilius Lepidus Livianus as Princeps Senatus.

In 70 BC, Clodianus helped contribute to Cicero's famous prosecution of the corrupt governor Verres by submitting evidence in support of Cicero's case.

By 67 BC, Clodianus was serving as a legate with praetorian imperium under Pompey, who had received an extraordinary command to rid the Mediterranean Sea of pirates. Clodianus was given command of the east coast of Italy, with his fleet patrolling the coast of the Adriatic Sea. By 66 BC he was back in Rome, where he gave his support to the Lex Manilia, which gave Pompey command of the war against King Mithridates VI of Pontus.

Although Clodianus was a noted orator, it was said that he hid his lack of talent through showmanship and the possession of a good voice.

== See also ==
- List of Roman consuls

== Sources ==
- T. Robert S. Broughton, The Magistrates of the Roman Republic, Vol II (1952).
- Holmes, T. Rice, The Roman Republic and the Founder of the Empire, Vol. I (1923)
- Sumner, G.V. (1973). The Orators in Cicero's Brutus: Prosopography and Chronology. University of Toronto Press. ISBN 0-8020-5281-9.
- Syme, Ronald, The Roman Revolution, Clarendon Press, Oxford, 1939.
- Anthon, Charles & Smith, William, A New Classical Dictionary of Greek and Roman Biography, Mythology and Geography (1860).

Political offices
Preceded by M. Terentius Varro Lucullus; G. Cassius Longinus	Consul of Rome; 72 BC; With: Lucius Gellius	Succeeded by P. Cornelius Lentulus Sura; Gn. Aufidius Orestes
