= Köstler =

Köstler, Koestler is a family surname.

Köstler, Koestler:

- Arthur Koestler (1905–1983), a Hungarian political writer
  - The Koestler Trust, a charity
  - Arthur Koestler, the title of a book by Mark Levene in 1984
  - Arthur Koestler/Arrow in the Blue, the title of an autobiography by Arthur Koestler
  - Living with Koestler: Mamaine Koestler's Letters 1945-51, a book about Arthur and Mamaine Koestler
  - Arthur Koestler: The Story of a Friendship, the title of a book by George Mikes in 1983
- Mamaine Koestler, née Paget (1916–1954), the 2nd wife of Arthur Koestler
- Marie Köstler (1879–1965), Austrian nurse, trade unionist and politician
- Jonathan "John" Koestler, a fictional character in the 2009 film Knowing.
