= Daphne Hardy Henrion =

British sculptor

- Daphne Hardy c.1941 Code name 'G' in Arthur Koestler's autobiography Scum of the Earth
- Born: 20 October 1917
- Died: 31 October 2003 (aged 86)

Daphne Hardy Henrion (20 October 1917 – 31 October 2003) was a British sculptor, a member of the Royal Society of British Sculptors and an intimate of the writer Arthur Koestler.

== Life ==
She was born Daphne Hardy in 1917 in Amersham, Buckinghamshire, to Major Clive Hardy, a diplomat and translator at the International Court of Justice, and his wife Judith. Between 1923 and 1931 she was educated in The Hague, at French and German schools. She left school aged 14 to study art privately in the Netherlands for a year with Marian Gobius and Albert Termote. From 1934 to 1937 she attended the Royal Academy Schools in London. In 1937 she won the school's gold medal and travelling scholarship which took her in 1938 to France and Italy.

In the summer of 1939 in Paris, through mutual friends she met the Hungarian writer Arthur Koestler and they became close. Her life with him just before and after the outbreak of the Second World War is described in Koestler's autobiography Scum of the Earth in which she appears as 'G'. At the outbreak of the war in 1939 she was translating into English Koestler's anti-Communist manuscript that he was writing in German. In the chaos following the declaration of war and the subsequent harassment and internment of Koestler by the French, she managed to save a copy of the translation and smuggle it to England in 1940, where in the following year it was published under the title Darkness at Noon. The title for the book was her idea.

During the war she worked for the Ministry of Information and after her release she began to establish her artistic reputation with a number of solo exhibitions and also with exhibits at the Royal Academy Summer Exhibitions.

In 1947 she married the graphic designer Henri Kay Henrion but left him in the 1970s. Her husband died in 1990. They had two sons and a daughter.

In 1951, she created the sculpture Youth for the Festival of Britain, modelled on a full size body cast of the artist. Originally displayed in front of the 51 bar on the festival's South Bank site, the statue has recently been re-discovered in the grounds of a house in Hampstead once occupied by the sculptor. It has since been acquired by the Museum of London, who intend to put it on public display after it has been restored. Her work includes a statue of Christ at the Modernist Our Lady of Fatima Church, Harlow.

From 1980 she was a member of the Royal Society of British Sculptors.

Her bust of Arthur Koestler was shown at the Royal Academy in 1984. Bronze casts of the bust were acquired by the National Portrait Gallery and the Koestler Foundation. She kept on working until failing eyesight in her eighties stopped her sculpting.
