= The Heel of Achilles: Essays 1968–1973 =

Book by Arthur Koestler

- First U.S. edition cover
- Author: Arthur Koestler
- Language: English
- Publisher: Hutchinson (United Kingdom)
- Media type: Print
- Pages: 254
- ISBN: 0-091-19400-8
- OCLC: 1066865
- Dewey Decimal: 814/.52 19
- LC Class: PR6021.O4 H4

The Heel of Achilles: Essays 1968–1973 is a book by Arthur Koestler. It is a collection of writings, lectures, addresses, book reviews, newspaper articles, etc.

== Contents ==
The Urge to Self-destruction: Edited version of the Sonning Prize Acceptance Address to the University of Copenhagen, April 1968, and of a paper read at the Fourteenth Nobel Symposium, Stockholm, September 1969.

Rebellion in a Vacuum: Revised version of a paper prepared for the symposium ‘The University and the Ethics of Change’ at Queen's University, Kingston, Canada, November 1968. First published in The Political Quarterly, October–December 1969.

Can Psychiatrists be Trusted?: Paper read at the World Psychiatric Association Symposium on ‘Uses and Abuses of Psychiatry’, London, November 1969.

Life in 1980 – The Rule of Mediocracy: In September 1969, as the decade was drawing to its close, The Times of London invited six members of different professions ‘to try to forecast what life in 1980 will be like’. Koestler's contribution appeared on 2 October 1969.

Sins of Omission: While Six Million Died by Arthur D. More. Reviewed in the Observer, 7 April 1968.

The Future if any: The Biological Time-Bomb by Gordon Rattray Taylor. Reviewed in the Observer, 21 April 1968.

Going Down the Drain : The Doomsday Book by Gordon Rattray Taylor. Reviewed in the Sunday Times, 6 September 1970.

Benighted Attitudes : The Biocrats by Gerald Leach. Reviewed in the Observer, 26 April 1970.

The Naked Touch : Intimate Behaviour by Desmond Morris. Reviewed in the Observer, 10 October 1971.

Not by Hate Alone : Love and Hate by Irenaus Eibl-Eibesfeld. Reviewed in the Sunday Times, 18 February 1972.

Hypnotic Horizons : Mind and Body by Stephen Black. Reviewed in the Observer, 20 April 1969.

Anatomy of a Canard : Rumour in Orleans by Edgar Morin. Reviewed in the Sunday Times, 4 July 1971.

The Abishag Complex : The Greening of America by Charles A. Reich. Reviewed in the Sunday Times, 2 May 1971.

Prophet and Poseur : Antimemoirs by André Malraux, translated by Terence Kilmartin. Reviewed in the Observer, 22 September 1968.

Telepathy and Dialectics : Psychic Discoveries by the Russians edited by Martin Ebon. Reviewed in the New Statesman, 4 May 1973.

Wittgensteinomania : Wittgenstein's Vienna by Alan Janik and Stephen Toulmin. Reviewed in the Observer, 3 June 1973.

In Memory of A. D. Peters : Obituary Note on the literary agent A. D. Peters. Published in the Sunday Times, 4 February 1973.

Literature and the Law of Diminishing Returns : The Cheltenham Lecture, given at the Cheltenham Festival of Literature, November 1969.

Science and Para-science : Banquet Address to the Annual Convention of the Parapsychological Association, Edinburgh, September 1972.

Science and Reality : Broadcast Interview, National Broadcasting Company, New York City, September 1972.

Solitary Confinement : Transcript of a discussion with Anthony Grey, from the television programme One Pair of Eyes, in which he related his experiences as a prisoner in China, June 1971.

The Faceless Continent : First published in the Sunday Times, 25 May 1969.

Farewell Gauguin : A Joyless Traveller's Guide to the South Pacific. First published in the Sunday Times, 13 April 1969.

Marrakech : First published in the Sunday Telegraph Magazine, 8 September 1972.

The Glorious Bloody Game : The chess championship match between Boris Spassky and Bobby Fischer in Reykjavík in 1972.

1 Reflections of an addict First published in the Sunday Times, 2 July 1972.

2 A requiem for Reykjavík First published in the Sunday Times, 31 August 1972.
