= The Encyclopœdia of Sexual Knowledge =

The Encyclopaedia of Sexual Knowledge, under the editorship of Dr. Norman Haire (1892–1952), is the first of a trilogy of sexual encyclopaedias by Arthur Koestler writing under the pen name of ‘Dr. A. Costler’. It is the English version, published by Koestler's cousin Francis Aldor in 1934, of the book L'encyclopédie de la vie sexuelle that Koestler in 1933 wrote, together with "A. Willy" (the pseudonym of his other cousin Willy Aldor) and the German Dr. Ludwig Levy-Lenz. The second book is Sexual Anomalies and Perversions, Physical and Psychological Development, Diagnoses and Treatment. The title of the third book is, in the original French edition of 1939, L'Encyclopédie de la famille. This third book was subsequently translated into English and published under various titles and with changes to the structure and text of the original edition. The name of ‘Dr. Costler’ (or 'A. Coester') as the author or co-author of the book is omitted from later editions.

The first book contained chapters by two other authors; the second I wrote alone; the third contained chapters by Manès Sperber (who had been a practising Psychotherapist before he made his reputation as a novelist).

Koestler wrote that working from standard text books and reference works "I condensed and distilled the Encyclopædia at a rate of about four thousand words a day."

The background to Koestler’s collaboration in the writing of these books is set out in detail in his autobiography The Invisible Writing, Chapter XIX. ‘Introducing Dr. Coster’. As noted there, The Encyclopœdia was highly successful and became a best-seller in several languages, but Koestler himself had little benefit of it, being shamelessly exploited by the publisher – a crooked cousin of his. Koestler received a flat payment of sixty pounds and no royalties from the sales, which amounted to tens of thousands.

== Contents ==
The book is divided into ten ‘Books’ (main chapters) and two Appendices. Each ‘Book’ consists of several Sections and Chapters. The book contains numerous monochrome illustrations and 32 colour plates. 836 numbered pages.

- Preface
- Book One: Sexual Art of Primitive and Other Races
- Book Two: The Road to a Full Sex Life
- Book Three: Sexual Organs in Function
- Book Four: Sexual Intercourse
- Book Five: Men and Women in their Everyday Relations
- Book Six: Women’s Sexual Impulse
- Book Seven: Procreation
- Book Eight: Birth Control
- Book Nine: Imperfections of Love
- Book Ten: Delaying Sexual Death
- Appendix I: (Untitled)
- Appendix II: Forbidden Fashions – Forbidden Nudity
