= Janus: A Summing Up =

1978 book by Arthur Koestler

- First US edition
- Author: Arthur Koestler
- Language: English
- Publisher: Hutchinson & Co (UK); Random House (US)
- Publication date: 1978
- Publication place: United States
- Media type: Print
- Pages: 354
- ISBN: 0-330-25842-7

Janus: A Summing Up is a 1978 book by Arthur Koestler, in which the author develops his philosophical idea of the holarchy. First introduced in Koestler's 1967 book, The Ghost in the Machine, the holarchy provides a coherent way of organizing knowledge and nature all together.

== The Holarchy ==
The holarchy concept states that everything is composed of holons, which are simultaneously parts and wholes. Each holon is a constituent of a larger entity while also containing smaller holons within. Like Janus, each holon has two faces - one looking inward, representing the whole, and the other looking outward, representing the part. Koestler believed this organization exists in all healthy systems, including the human body, chemistry, and the history of philosophy.

The concept of holon, however, is closely integrated in Janus with the theory of complex systems as was developed by Ludwig von Bertalanffy and Herbert Simon, both well known investigators and friends of Koestler. Janus put together one of the first broad based arguments for incorporating the theory of complex systems into the philosophy of science and epistemology.

== Editions ==
- Hutchinson, 1978, U.K, hardcover edition ISBN 0-09-132100-X
- Random House, 1978, U.S. hardcover edition ISBN 0-394-50052-0
- Picador, 1979, or Pan Macmillan, 1983 UK paperback editions ISBN 0-330-25842-7
- Vintage Books, 1979, U.S. paperback edition ISBN 0-394-72886-6

== See also ==
- Holism
