= Hendrick Island =

Island in Bucks County, Pennsylvania, United States

Coordinates: 40°24′27″N 74°59′40″W

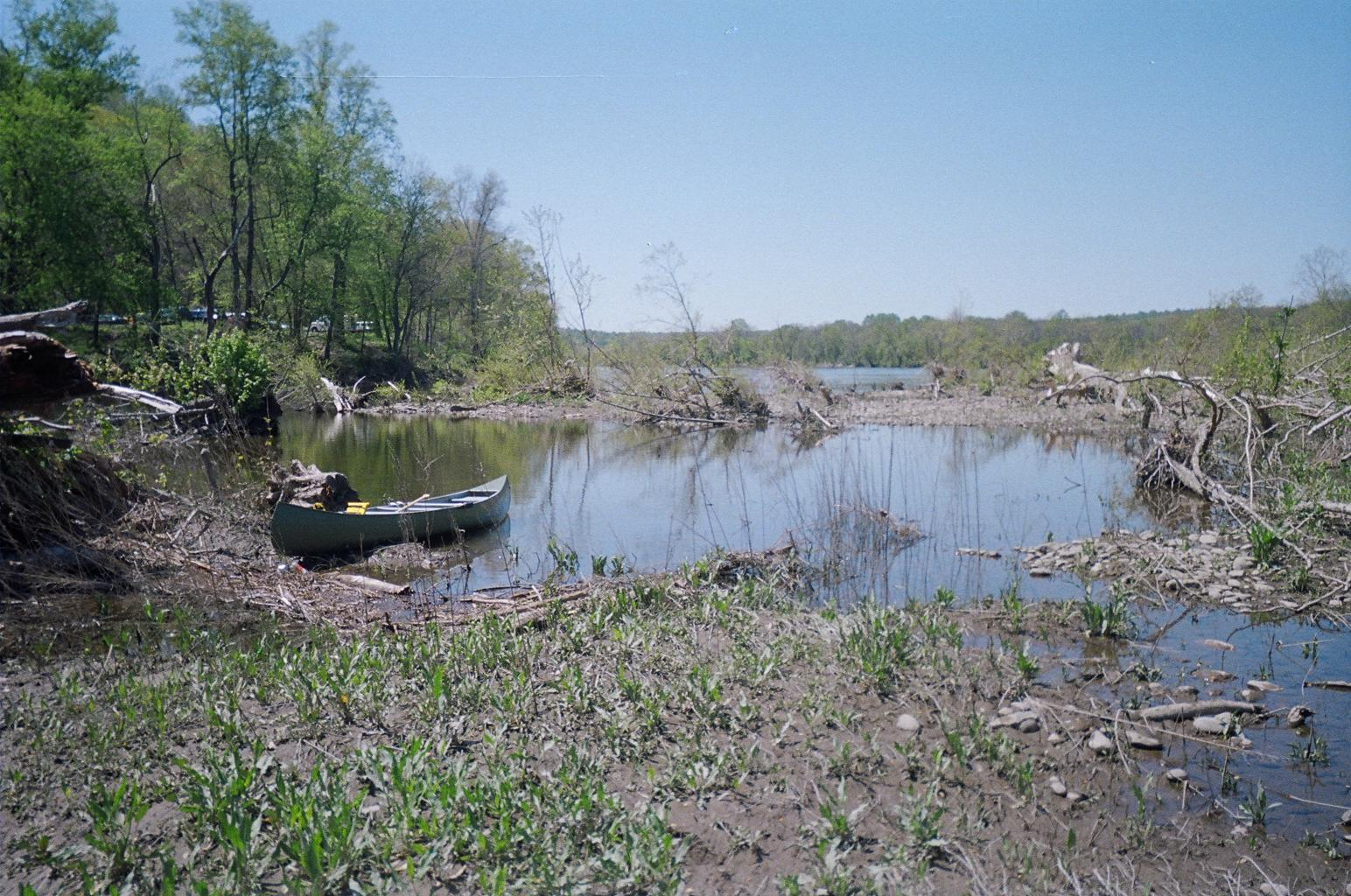
A harbor along Hendrick Island's more accessible western coast

Hendrick Island is a large erosional feature in Bucks County, Pennsylvania. Once part of the main shoreline, a sizable channel of the Delaware River now separates it from the rest of the state. The island is part of Solebury Township and a protected natural area within Delaware Canal State Park.

== Geography ==
Hendrick Island is located at the beginning of a turn in the Delaware River north of New Hope, Pennsylvania. Unlike most islands in the Delaware, it was once connected to the mainland of Pennsylvania. Since then, three channels in the river have formed in the area: one between Pennsylvania and Hendrick Island, the main channel between Hendrick Island and Eagle Island to the east, and another channel between Eagle Island and New Jersey.

The 112-acre (45 ha) island supports a large deciduous forest, despite its somewhat sandy soil. Wildlife includes deer, which occasionally swim to the island from Pennsylvania, and squirrels. The shoreline is generally rocky, especially along the eastern coast and northern tip, and populated by several species of fish and water snakes. The more recently formed western coast is more irregular and less rocky than the eastern. The island tapers to another rocky point at its southern end, three-quarters of a mile downstream from the northern point.

Also uncommon among the islands of the Delaware, Hendrick Island has quite varied topography. The center of the island is about 15 feet (4.6 m) above the normal height of the river. As a result, there are two distinct ecological areas on the island: a flat, frequently submerged riparian habitat along the shore and a deciduous forest habitat farther inland typical of the terrain in the surrounding areas of Pennsylvania and New Jersey.

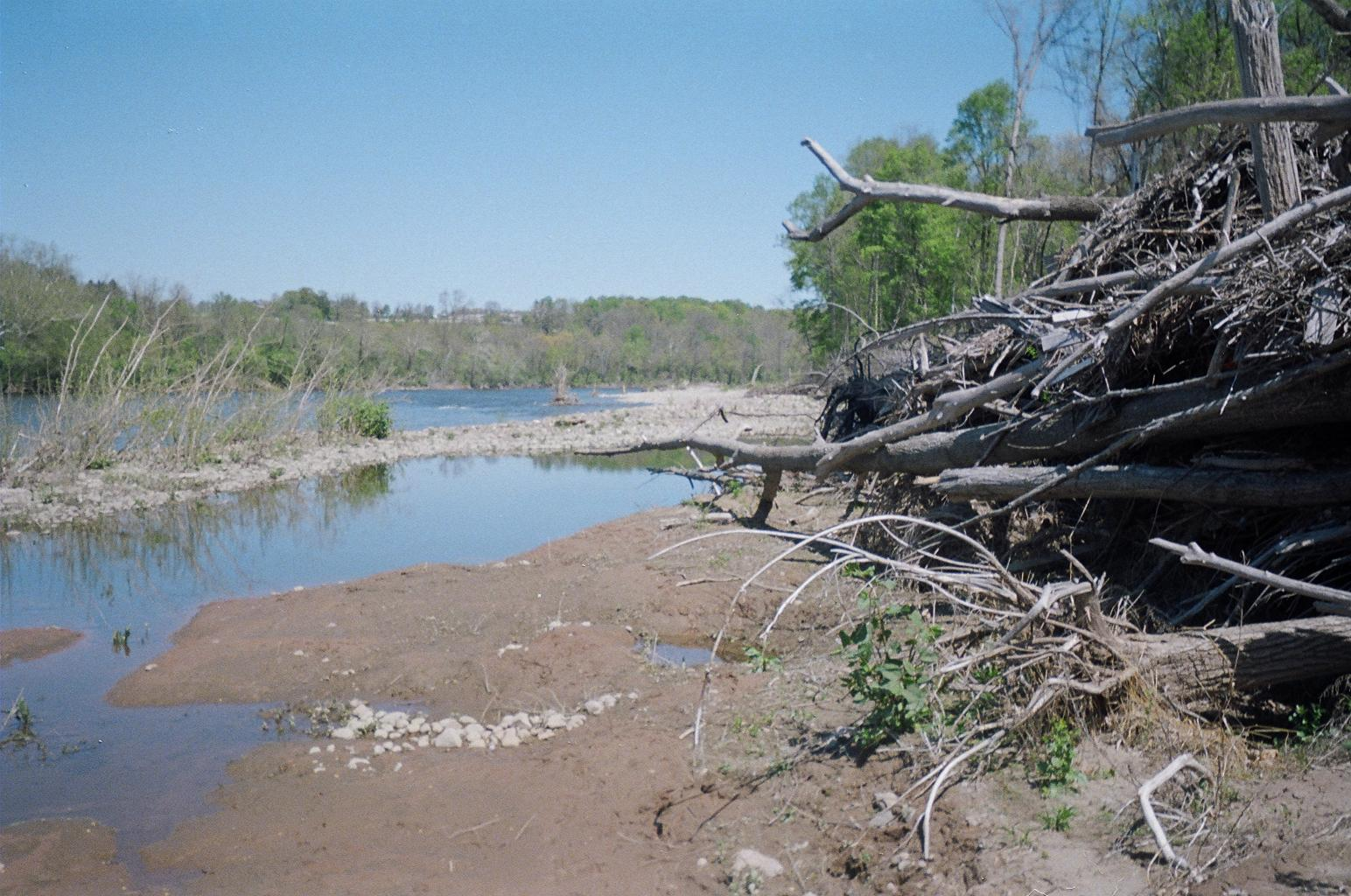
Hendrick Island's rocky eastern shore

== Accessibility and Recreation ==
Hendrick Island is a protected natural area within Pennsylvania's Delaware Canal State Park. As such, people are encouraged to visit during the day, but camping is prohibited.

The only ways to the island are swimming or boating. Canoeists and kayakers have the option of launching from a small parking lot maintained by the Pennsylvania State Park Service adjacent to the north point of the island or from Bull's Island recreational area roughly one mile (1.6 km) upstream on the New Jersey shore of the river. A public boat launch several miles downstream in Lambertville, New Jersey makes a convenient place to take out a boat. Any unpowered boats launched from the parking lot on the Pennsylvania side require a launch permit from the Pennsylvania Fish & Boat Commission. Larger boats should not attempt to approach the island's rocky shore line. Boaters passing by the area of the island are best off going through the far eastern channel of the river between Eagle Island and New Jersey; the other two channels are frequently too shallow for safe passage.

The shoreline of the island constantly changes with the level of the river, so there is no one consistent best spot for landings, but the northern part of the western coast is generally the most favorable area. In low water conditions, it is often much easier to wade to the island from the Pennsylvania shore than attempt to boat over.

== History ==
From the 18th century until 1866, the island had various names, changing with each new owner. In that year, it was bought by Mr. John Hendrick, a local farmer. It stayed in the family for three decades, and supposedly his son and daughter-in-law lived with their child in a house on the island some time during this period. Since then, despite continued changes in ownership, the name Hendrick Island has persisted. No confirmed traces of the Hendrick household remain, though there are what appear to be the foundations of a few destroyed buildings on the southern half of the island.

In 1950, this island, known as "Hooker's Island", or "Island Farm" at this time, was bought in auction by the writer Arthur Koestler, as described in his book Stranger on the square. He sold the island in 1954.

In 1955 the island was bought by PECO Energy, which was interested in constructing a hydroelectric power plant. However, the site was never developed and in 1996 the island was bought by the Bucks County Heritage Conservancy. Currently it is managed by the Pennsylvania Department of the Conservation of Natural Resources as a natural area within Delaware Canal State Park.

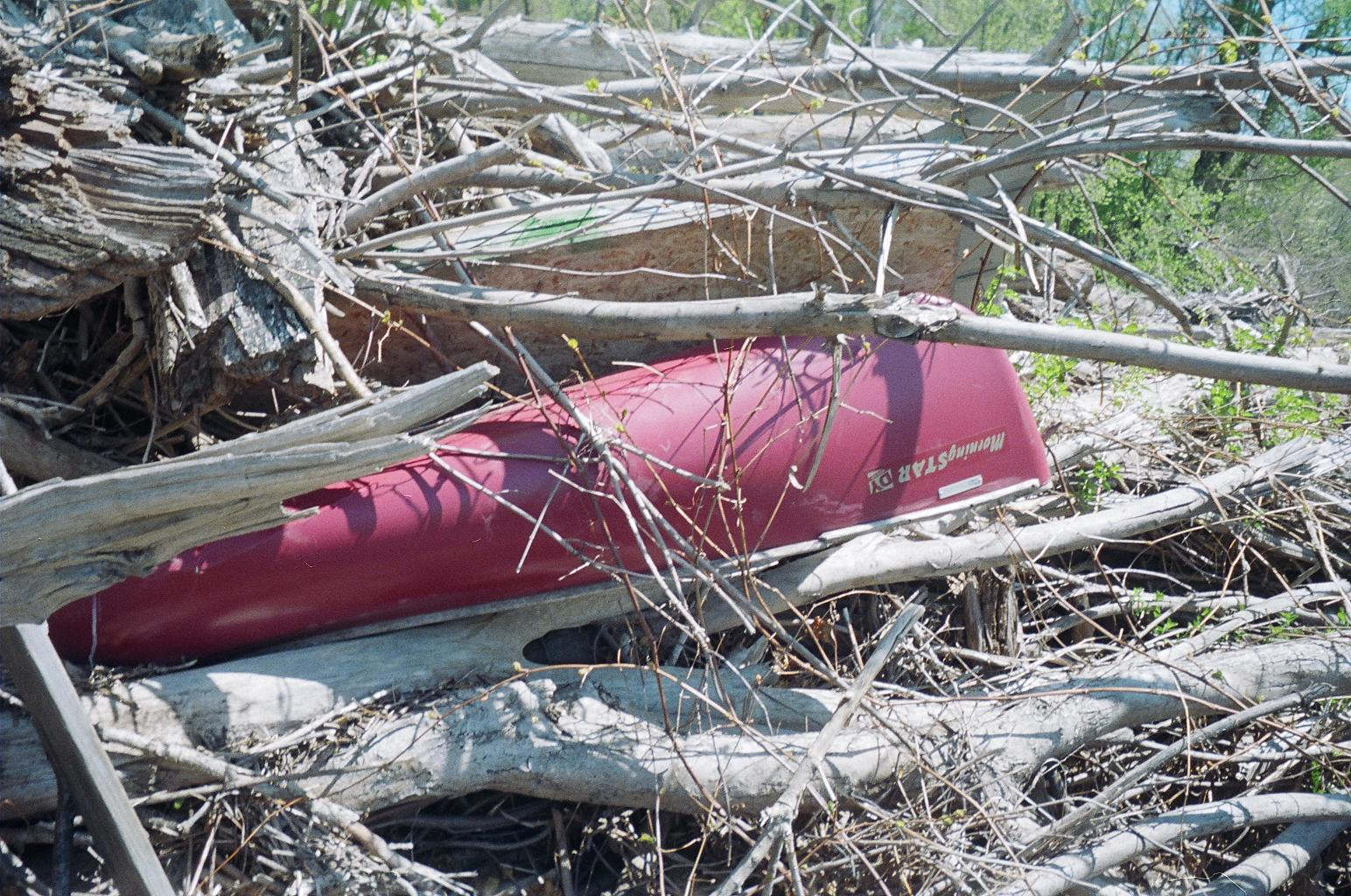
Debris, including a crushed canoe, from the floods of 2004-2005

Since the floods of 2004-2005, the riparian areas of Hendrick Island have been choked by debris carried to the island from upstream, especially along the western shore. Though access to the interior of the island from the western shore is now limited, it appears that little ecological damage has been done.

== See also ==
- Delaware River
