= The Yogi and the Commissar =

1945 essay collection by Arthur Koestler

- First edition cover (Jonathan Cape)
- Author: Arthur Koestler
- Language: English
- Subject: Soviet Union; Communism
- Publisher: Macmillan
- Publication date: 1945
- Publication place: United States
- Media type: Print
- Pages: 2476
- OCLC: 2594319
- Dewey Decimal: 940.5
- LC Class: PR6021.O4

The Yogi and the Commissar (1945) is a collection of essays of Arthur Koestler, divided in three parts: Meanderings, Exhortations and Explorations. In the first two parts he has collected essays written from 1942 to 1945 and the third part was written especially for this book.

In the title essay, Koestler proposes a continuum of philosophies for achieving "heaven on earth", from the Commissar at the materialist, scientific end of the spectrum, to the Yogi at the spiritual, metaphysical end. The Commissar wants to change society using any means necessary, while the Yogi wants to change the individual, with an emphasis on ethical purity instead of on results.

"Between these two extremes are spread out in a continuous sequence the spectral lines of the more sedate, human attitudes. The more we approach its centre, the more the spectrum becomes blurred and woolly. On the other hand, this increase of wool on the naked spectral bodies makes them look more decent and intercourse with them more civilized."

Using a metaphor of spectra of radiation, Koestler figures the Commissar at the infra-red end of the spectrum; the Yogi is ultra-violet. He suggested that neither end is in the realm of visible light. Consequently, the full dynamics of history and culture escape us.

Koesler preceded The Yogi and the Commissar with his 1943 essay The Birth of a Myth, an expanded version of which was later published in chapter VI of Part One of The Yogi and the Commissar as In Memory of Richard Hillary.
