= The Ghost in the Machine =

1967 book by Arthur Koestler

- First UK edition
- Author: Arthur Koestler
- Subject: Philosophy, psychiatry
- Publisher: Hutchinson (UK); Macmillan (US)
- Publication date: 1967
- Media type: Print
- Pages: 381 (UK), 384 (US)

The Ghost in the Machine is a 1967 book about philosophical psychology by Arthur Koestler. The title is a phrase (see ghost in the machine) coined by the Behaviourist Oxford philosopher Gilbert Ryle to describe the Cartesian dualist account of the mind–body relationship. Koestler shares with Ryle the view that the mind of a person is not an independent non-material entity, temporarily inhabiting and governing the body, yet he argues that Behaviourism's reduction of human beings to mere "meat machines" is also unsatisfactory. Koestler proposes that the relationship between brain and mind is more layered and complex—what he calls a "hierarchical" system rather than a simple duality or monolithic mechanism. The work attempts to explain humanity's self-destructive tendency in terms of individual and collective functioning, philosophy, and overarching, cyclical political–historical dynamics, peaking in the nuclear weapons arena.

== Overview ==
In an attempt to explain human violence, Koestler criticizes the dominant conceptions of psychology of his time (behaviourism) that postulate that human behaviours are subject to the selection of the fittest. For him this theory echoed the Darwinian conceptions of the evolution of species.

The book also contributes to the longstanding debate surrounding the mind–body problem and focuses in particular on René Descartes's dualism, in the form elucidated by Ryle. Koestler's materialistic account argues that the personal experience of duality arises from what Koestler calls a holon. The notion of a holon emerges from the observation that everything in nature is both a whole and a part. This is true of atoms, which are whole in themselves, but also parts of molecules; molecules, which can be both whole and part of cells; and cells, which are both autonomous units and parts of organisms. It is also true for human beings, who have an independent life and are part of social systems. Every holon is willing to express two contradictory tendencies: to express itself, and to disappear into something greater. For humans, those tendencies lead to an error in development: we create collective units based on the oppression of some individuals and the inflated egos of others. This is for Koestler an error of transcendence that is reflected in a poor integration of our reptilian brain and cognitive brain.

A superposition of forces manifests, at each bodily holon, as the outcome of an entire hierarchy of forces—ontogenetic, habitual, linguistic prescriptive, and social—operating in a continuum of independent feedback and feedforward streams of a body extended to its larger environment. The streams are fed by the life signals of each and every group member, and this fully participative medley is the spirit of life one senses as a ghost; but this spirit is just a simplified output of a complex knowledge set; it is emergent from the complexity of the group's rules and strategies. He contrasts his basic approach to the mind–body problem with behaviourism's basic approach to the problem.

Following the holon of humanity down to its roots, the work explains humanity's tendency toward self-destruction in terms of brain structure, philosophies, and its overarching, cyclical political–historical dynamics, reaching the height of its potential in the nuclear arms arena.

One of the book's central concepts is that as the human triune brain has evolved, it has retained and built upon earlier, more primitive brain structures. The head portion of the "ghost in the machine" has, as a consequence of poor, inadequate connections, a rich potential for conflict. The primitive layers can, and may, together, overpower rational logic's hold. This explains a person's hate, anger, and other such emotional distress.

In Janus: A Summing Up (1978) Koestler continues the theories developed in The Ghost in the Machine and further elaborates on the concept of holarchy.

== Publication details ==
- Koestler, Arthur (1967). The Ghost in the Machine (1990 reprint ed.). Penguin Group. ISBN 0-14-019192-5.

== See also ==
- Emergent materialism
