= The Call-Girls =

1972 novel by Arthur Koestler

- First edition cover (publ. Hutchinson)
- Author: Arthur Koestler
- Publication date: 1972
- ISBN: 0-09-112550-2

The Call-Girls: A Tragi-Comedy with Prologue and Epilogue (ISBN 0-09-112550-2) is 1972 a novel by Hungarian-British author Arthur Koestler. Its plot tells the story of a group of academic scientists struggling to understand the human tendency towards self-destruction, while the group members gradually become more suspicious and aggressive towards each other.

The prologue and epilogue are two short stories which are connected to the main text of the novel by theme rather than plot. The prologue, "The Misunderstanding", is an interior monologue of Jesus Christ as he makes his way to the site of the Crucifixion. The epilogue, "The Chimeras", is a conversation between a psychiatrist and a man who believes that the world is being taken over by monsters.

In this novel Koestler introduces the term cocacolonization to refer to the expansion of a typical modern diet, consisting of such fare as hamburgers, French fries, fat-rich snacks, soft drinks high in sugar. Nowadays the term is widely used by physicians when they want to explain, at least in part, the global expansion of obesity, diabetes and cardiovascular risk factors.
