= The Sleepwalkers: A History of Man's Changing Vision of the Universe =

Book by Arthur Koestler

- First UK edition (published by Hutchinson)
- Author: Arthur Koestler
- Language: English
- Subject: Astronomy and cosmology
- Published: 1959 (Hutchinson)
- Publication place: United Kingdom
- Media type: Print (Hardcover)
- OCLC: 186163756

The Sleepwalkers: A History of Man's Changing Vision of the Universe is a 1959 book by Arthur Koestler. It traces the history of Western cosmology from ancient Mesopotamia to Isaac Newton. He suggests that discoveries in science arise through a process akin to sleepwalking. Not that they arise by chance, but rather that scientists are neither fully aware of what guides their research, nor are they fully aware of the implications of what they discover.

== Summary ==
Koestler 's historical narrative begins in antiquity with the Ionian school of pre-Socratic philosophy, including Anaximander and Anaximenes. Koestler writes that Anaximander's ideas were the first mechanical (i.e. non-religious, non-metaphysical) model of the solar system. Koestler describes the Ionian era as a brief era of progress whose promise was cut short by a return to superstition and mysticism. He then delves into the profound influence of Plato, particularly Plato's confident claim that the shape of the world must be a perfect sphere and that all motion must be in perfect circles at uniform speed, which Koestler characterizes as laying a two thousand year curse on astronomy.

The heart of the book is the story of how Plato's curse was ultimately broken by the "sleepwalkers" of the book's title. He introduces Copernicus who, for Koestler, is the sleepiest of all the sleepwalkers. Koestler sharply criticizes the modern view of Copernicus - an official in the Catholic Church from the age of 24 to his death at 70 - as any kind of revolutionary. Far from being anything that moderns would recognize as science, Koestler says that Copernicus' heliocentric model was actually just another effort to make astronomical observations obey Plato's requirements of circular motion. Trying to obey Plato's dictum, Koestler says Copernicus' heliocentric model was at least as complicated (if not more complicated) than Ptolemy's. Copernicus' motivation was religious: he wanted to show how the motions of the "heavenly spheres" were (if looked at correctly) truly "heavenly."

Koestler describes Tycho Brahe, the flamboyant and meticulous Danish nobleman, as far more of a true revolutionary than Copernicus. Copernicus relied on a tiny number of observations of planetary motion because if you assume that the planets are moving in circles, a few observations are enough to describe an orbit. Brahe, in sharp contrast to both Copernicus and the two thousand years of astronomers since Plato, spent an enormous fortune creating new instruments and spent over two decades creating a vast and highly accurate dataset of tens of thousands of planetary observations, far surpassing anything that had come before.

Everything that comes next relies on Brahe's unprecedented data but also depends on the strange genius of Johannes Kepler, who spent arduous, often torturous, years trying to make Brahe's data make some kind of mathematical sense. It was Kepler who finally broke Plato's long curse. The first of Kepler's 3 laws of planetary motion rejected two thousand years of accepted wisdom: planetary orbits are elliptical, not circular.

Kepler published his first law of planetary motion in 1609 and Galileo lived for three decades after that. But Galileo - despite his brilliance - never acknowledged that planetary orbits are elliptical and instead maintained until the end of his life that they are circular. It was only when Newton published his law of universal gravitation in the 1680s - where he was able to derive Kepler's laws - that the work of Brahe and Kepler was finally broadly accepted in the scientific community.

== Reception ==
French mathematician Alexandre Grothendieck wrote about The Sleepwalkers that "The metaphor of the 'sleepwalker' was inspired by the title of the wonderful book 'the sleepwalkers' by Koestler".

Irish writer John Banville stated that the "original idea" of his Revolutions Trilogy came from his reading of The Sleepwalkers, and also that Koestler

deserves to be remembered also as a bridge between the two cultures. The Sleepwalkers, his account of cosmology from the Greeks to Einstein, is still a wonderfully exciting and informative book. It was his misfortune as a writer that his best work was done in the inevitably ephemeral medium of journalism.

The historian of astronomy Owen Gingerich, while acknowledging that Koestler's book contributed to his interest in the history of science, described it as "highly questionable" and criticized its treatment of historical figures as fictional. Gingerich said Koestler was wrong when he wrote that Copernicus's De revolutionibus was a "book that nobody had read" and "one of the greatest editorial failures of all time."

== Publication data ==
- Arthur Koestler, The Sleepwalkers: A History of Man's Changing Vision of the Universe (1959), Hutchinson
- First published in the United States by Macmillan in 1959
- Published by Penguin Books in 1964
- Reissued by Pelican Books in 1968
- Reprinted by Peregrine Books in 1986; ISBN 0-14-055212-X
- Reprinted by Arkana in 1989; ISBN 0-14-019246-8
- Chapters on Kepler excerpted as The Watershed published by Doubleday Anchor in 1960, as part of the Science Study Series.

== See also ==
- 1959 in literature
- Owen Gingerich
