= Thieves in the Night =

1946 novel by Arthur Koestler

First UK edition (publ. Macmillan)

Thieves in the Night: Chronicle of an Experiment is a novel by Arthur Koestler written in 1946. Originally intended to be the first of a trilogy, Koestler later concluded that the book stood well enough on its own for further novels to be redundant.

Based on the author's own experiences in a kibbutz, it sets up a stage in describing the historical roots of the conflict between Arabs and Jewish settlers in the British ruled Palestine.

The book tackles many subjects, such as Zionism and idealism. Koestler was a Revisionist Zionist in his teens and 20s, but in later life his attitude toward Zionism grew more distant.

The title is a Biblical reference, quoted on the title page:

"But the day of the Lord will come as a thief in the night." (2 Peter 3:10)

Related Biblical references:

"If thieves came to thee, if robbers by night, (how art thou cut off!) would they not have stolen till they had enough? if the grapegatherers came to thee, would they not leave some grapes?" (Obadiah 1:5)

"If grapegatherers come to thee, would they not leave some gleaning grapes? If thieves by night, they will destroy till they have enough." (Jeremiah 49:9)
