= The Lotus and the Robot =

1960 book by Arthur Koestler

- First US edition (publ. Macmillan)
- Author: Arthur Koestler
- Language: English
- Subject: Mysticism
- Published: 1960
- Media type: Print

The Lotus and the Robot is a 1960 book by Arthur Koestler, in which the author explores eastern mysticism. Although later dated by Westerners' greater exposure to Asian practices, it concentrates mainly on Indian and Japanese traditions, which form the two parts—the "lotus" and the "robot" respectively.

The book was banned in India for its negative portrayal of Gandhi.
