= Jesekiel David Kirszenbaum =

Jewish Polish painter of the School of Paris (1900–1954)

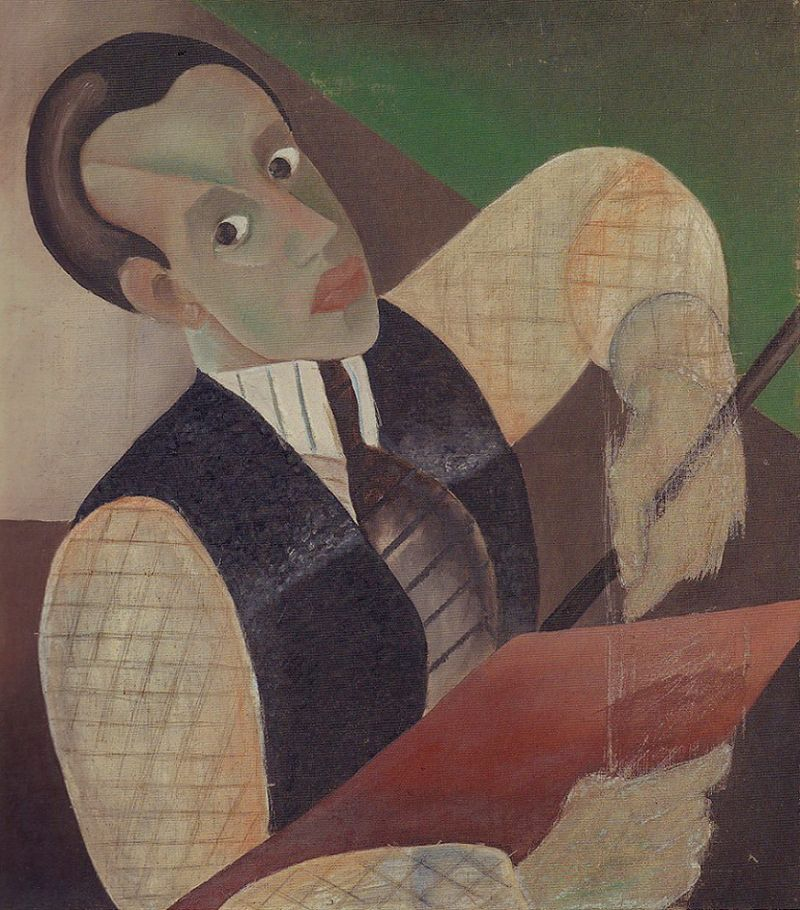
Jesekiel David Kirszenbaum, autoportrait 1925

Jesekiel David Kirszenbaum (1900–1954) was a Jewish Polish painter forced to leave his native town in Poland in order to both flee persecution as a Jew and develop his art. He is considered an artist of the School of Paris.

== Life ==
Kirszenbaum was born in Poland in the village of Staszów, district of Sandomierz, in 1900. He was the youngest son of a rabbinical scholar. He began drawing and painting at the age of twelve. At that time he produced primarily shop signboards and portraits of people he admired.

He immigrated to Germany in 1920. In 1923, he began his studies at the Bauhaus in Weimar, where he studied under Paul Klee and Wassily Kandinsky. He moved to Berlin in 1925, working as an illustrator and cartoonist for a number of Berlin newspapers under the pseudonym "Duvdivani". During this period, he participated in many local avant-garde exhibitions, including those sponsored by the Der Sturm gallery.

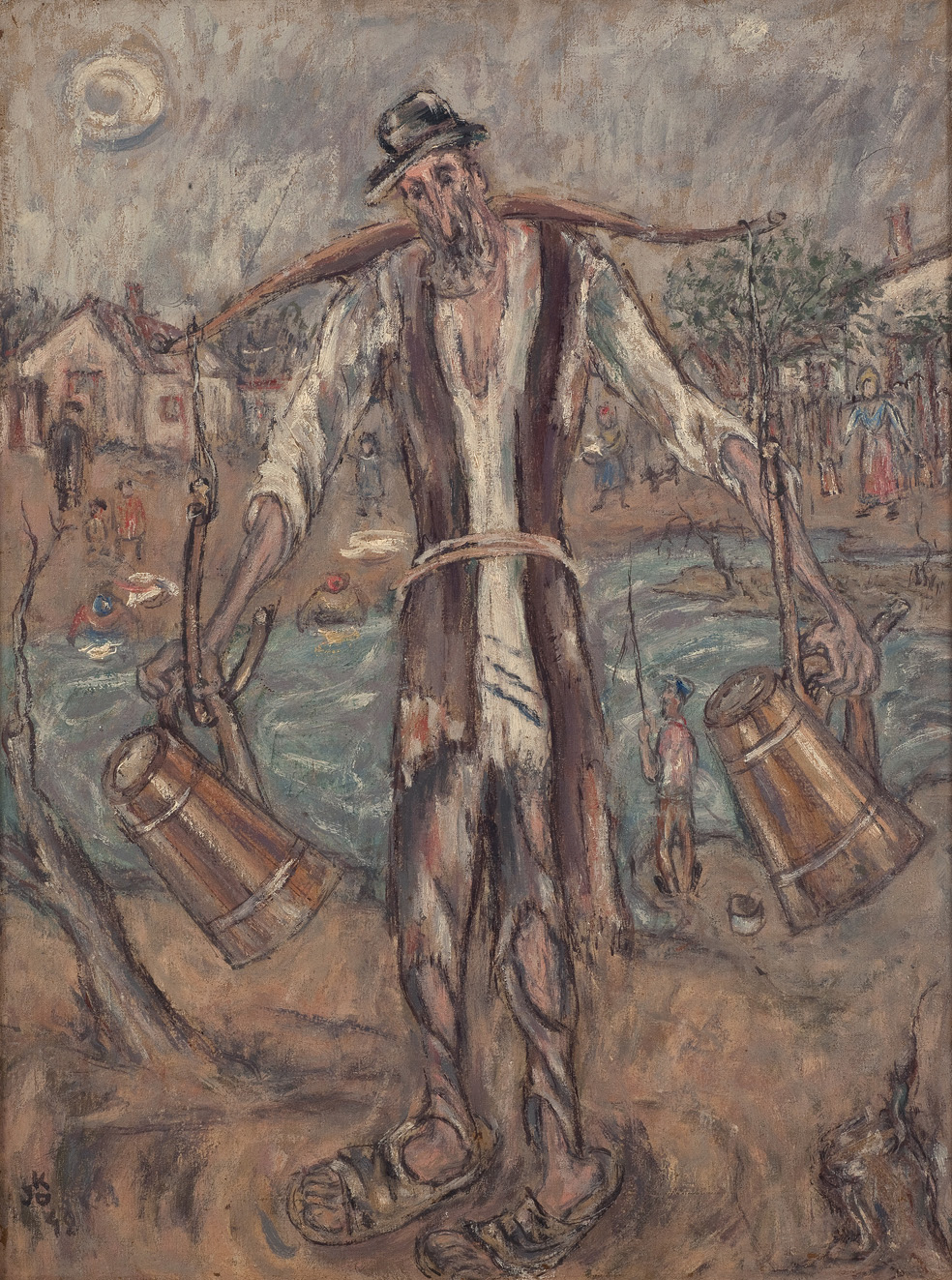
1942 painting

In 1933, he fled Germany and arrived with his wife Helma in Paris. Although they arrived as refugees, the next period in the artist's life was marked by great personal and artistic growth. Here he discovered the painting techniques of French Impressionism and Expressionism as espoused by many local Jewish artists in the so-called "School of Paris." Although influenced heavily by this exposure, Kirszenbaum developed his own very personal mode of expression, instilling something of the mysticism and loss that marked his personal journey as he fled Nazi Germany. Rampant in his work are elements reflective of the beliefs from his childhood as well as his native folklore.

The Second World War put an end to all his dreams. During the German occupation his studio was ransacked and more than 600 paintings and drawings were looted - nearly all his life's work. He was imprisoned in various work camps in Southern France, including the Camp du Vernet concentration camp. His wife was arrested, deported, and killed by Germans along with all the members of his family in Poland; none survived the German SS concentration camps.

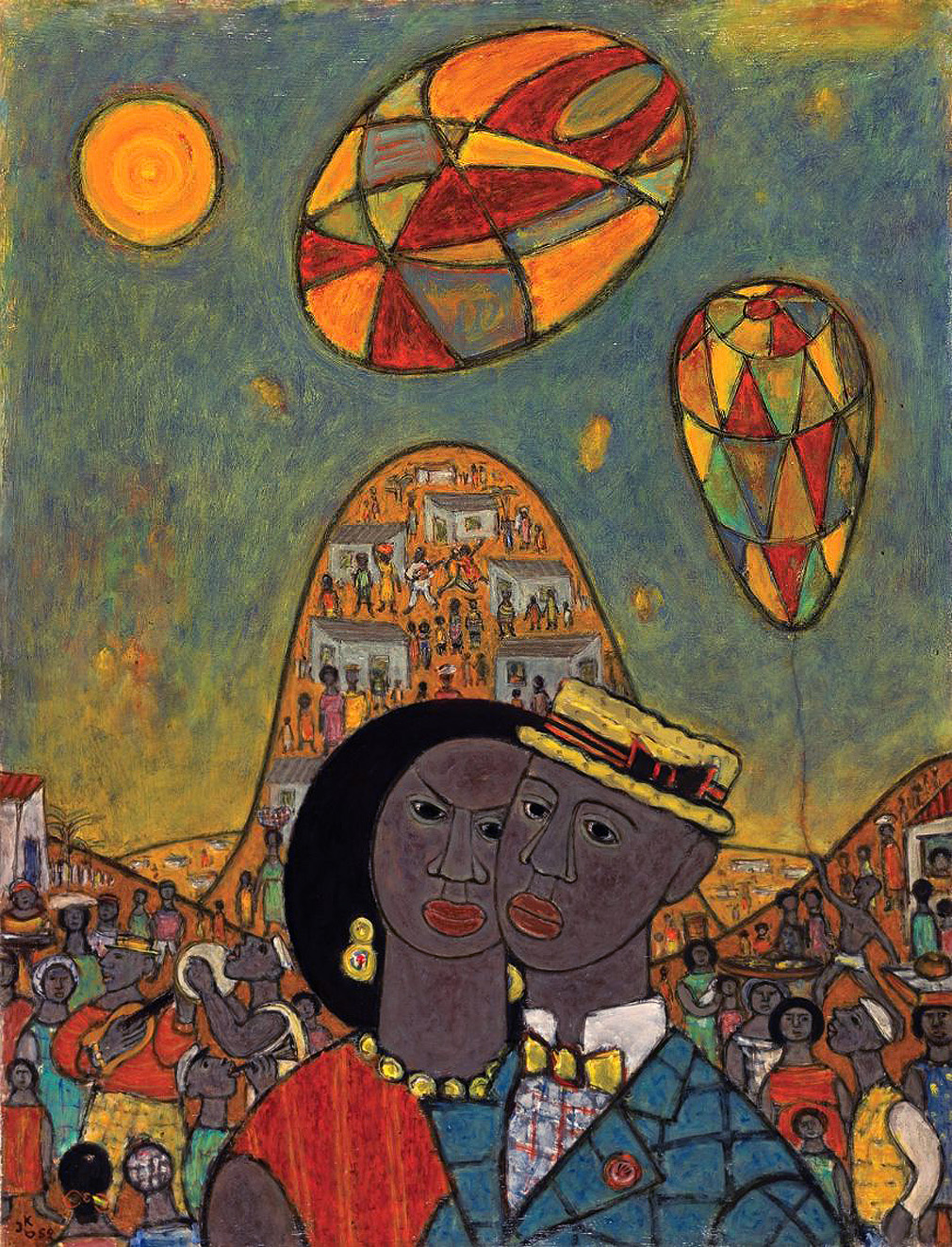
Festivity in São João 1952

After the war he returned to painting, thanks to the help of Alix de Rothschild. During these years of recovery, he lived in France before eventually embarking on an extended journey to Brazil and Morocco.

During his lifetime, Kirszenbaum exhibited his paintings in Weimar and Berlin in Germany; Utrecht and Amsterdam in the Netherlands; Limoges, Lyon, and Paris in France; and São Paulo and Rio de Janeiro in Brazil.

Kirszenbaum died from cancer in Paris, France, aged 54.

== His work ==
Though the Eastern European sources of his inspiration are often obvious, his style was always that of a disciple of Western European Art and of the schools that had undergone the influence of French Impressionism. In addition, he had absorbed the influence of German Expressionism.

His work – especially after the war – was haunted by elegiac recollection of things past. He was able to reconstruct the scenes of his childhood, bringing back to life the villages where he had lived. In his paintings, Kirszenbaum was also able to resurrect the prophets of the Old Testament.

His trips to Brazil and Morocco gave his art a new lease on life, allowing him to rediscover something of the original sources of his inspiration. He recaptured the mysticism of the vanished Eastern European Jewry, transforming the grotesque figures of Rio de Janeiro Carnival and its riotous joy into festivities he had known in his childhood. The influence of this period affected all his work, which in the future evoked less pessimism and melancholy.

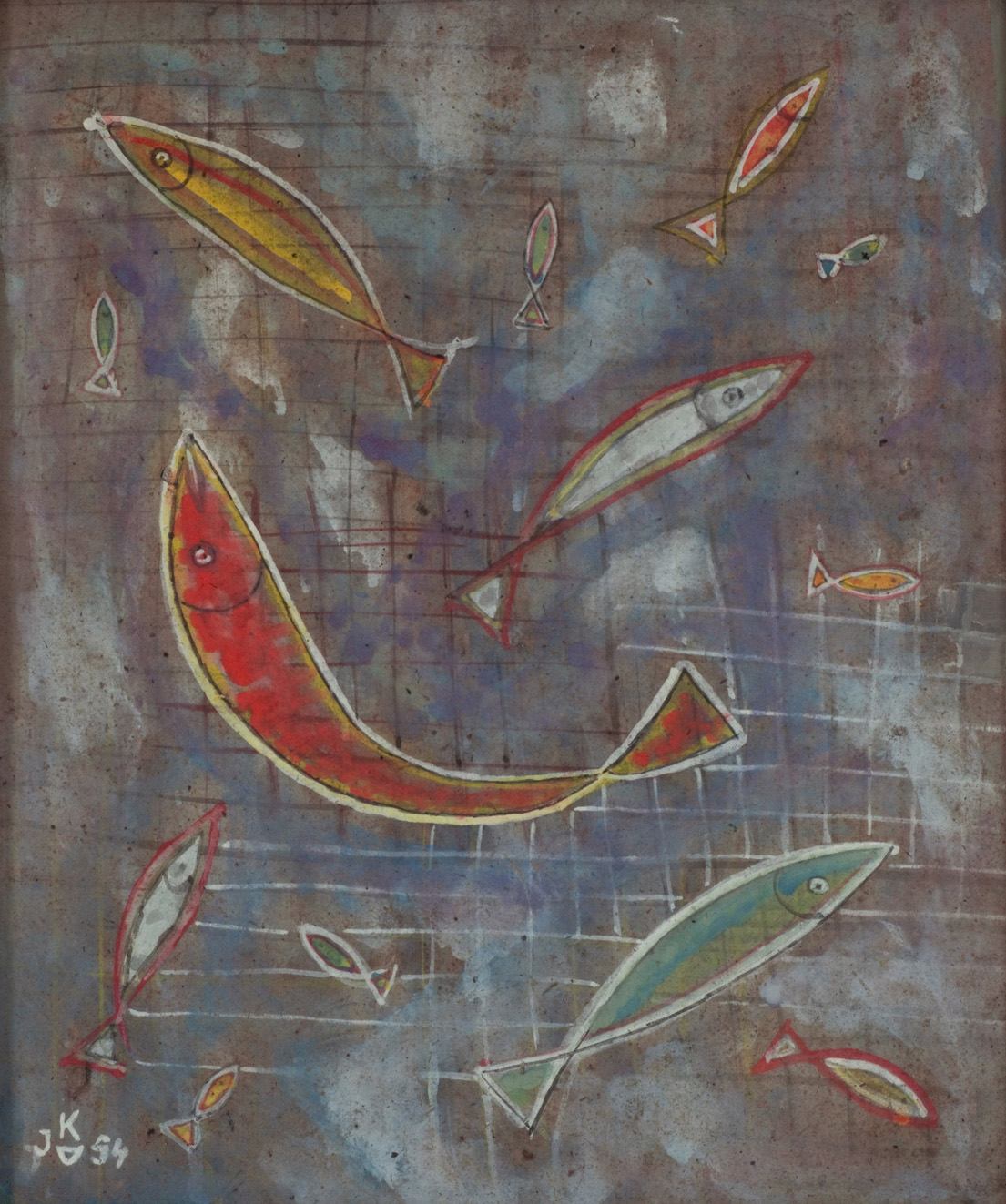
Fish, 1954

Kirszenbaum participated in the Jewish Renaissance, an avant-garde folkloric-based art movement that started in Russia and spread to Poland. Other notable Jewish artists in the Jewish Renaissance were Marc Chagall, Issachar Ber Ryback, El Lissitzky, B. Anderson, and Joseph Budko.

Kirszenbaum's works are spread in museums around the world. Public holders include the Collection Nationale Française in France, the Netherlands, Poland, and Israel. His work is also in private collections in France, Belgium, the Netherlands, UK, Brazil, US, and Israel.

Because of the loss of most of his pre-war works, Kirszenbaum's extant works are rarely offered at auctions.

== See also ==
- School of Paris
