= Frederick Henri Kay Henrion =

German-born British graphic designer (1914–1990)

Frederick Henri Kay Henrion OBE RDI
- Born: Heinrich Frederick Fritz Kohn; April 18, 1914; Nuremberg, Germany
- Died: July 5, 1990 (aged 76); London, England
- Occupation: Graphic designer
- Spouses: Daphne Hardy Henrion; Marion Wesel Henrion

Frederick Henri Kay Henrion (né Heinrich Fritz Kohn; 1914–1990), was a German-born British graphic designer, exhibition designer and poster artist.

== Early life and career ==
Henrion was born Heinrich Frederick Fritz Kohn on April 18, 1914 in Nuremberg, Germany, to Jewish parents. In 1933, Henrion, aged 21, moved to Paris, where he trained in textile design before studying with poster designer Paul Colin. In 1936, he was invited to London at the behest of the British Colonial Office, where he set up his studio and was granted British citizenship in 1946.

== World War II ==
After the beginning of the Second World War, Henrion was interned on the Isle of Man as a German alien. After a six-month imprisonment, he was released in 1940 and subsequently worked for the Ministry of Information and the US Office of War Information, designing posters for campaigns like Dig for Victory, Aid the Wounded, and Grow More Food.

== Career ==
=== Corporate identity ===
KLM logotype designed by Henrion, in 1961. Modified by Chris Ludlow at Henrion, Ludlow & Schmidt, in 1991.

After the war Henrion became art director at Contact Books, and in 1951 he started his own design consultancy named Henrion Design Associates. Henrion was one of the first graphic designers to form a design studio. As well as creating exhibitions, packaging, and book and magazine design, they worked within the then-emerging concept of corporate identity – with Henrion becoming a pioneer in the field.

His clients included:

- British European Airways
- Blue Circle Cement
- Coopers & Lybrand
- Giro
- KLM
- London Electricity Board
- The Post Office
- The National Theatre
- Tate & Lyle
- Wates

=== Exhibition design ===
Alongside his poster, packaging and advertising design work, Henrion was involved in the design of many exhibitions around the world. These included the Publicity Pavilion for the Paris International Fair, and the MARS (Modern Architectural Research Society) exhibition in London. He also worked on projects for the 1938 Glasgow Empire Exhibition, the 1939 New York World's Fair, and the Air France pavilion at the Tel Aviv Levant Fair, 1940.

After the war, Henrion continued to develop a reputation as an exhibition designer. He designed two of the pavilions at the 1951 Festival of Britain: The Country and The Natural Scene.

=== As educator ===
Henrion lectured at the Royal College of Art from 1955 to 1965, and was head of Visual Communication at the London College of Printing from 1976 to 1979. He also worked as an art editor for various publications, and contributed to the Council for Industrial Design's Design magazine.

== Affiliations and awards ==
Henrion was a member of the Artists' International Association, the Society of Industrial Artists and Designers (later the Chartered Society of Designers), and the Council of Industrial Design; in 1952 he became one of the earliest members of Alliance Graphique Internationale, in which designers from all over the world could meet and share ideas.

He was elected a Royal Designer for Industry in 1959. He was appointed MBE in 1951 and elevated to OBE in 1985.

Henrion was closely involved with design institutions such as the Council of Industrial Design (later the Design Council) and ICOGRADA (International Council of Graphic Design Associations).

== Personal life ==
Henrion married the British sculptor Daphne Hardy in 1947. Together they had two sons and a daughter. They separated in the 1970s. His second wife was Marion Wesel Henrion.

== Henrion's archive and library ==
Henrion's archive is held at The University of Brighton Design Archives. It covers his entire career and comprises correspondence with clients, original artwork, examples of packaging and graphic design and photography. It also includes Henrion's personal library of books on graphic and industrial design, typography and advertising, which is now fully searchable on the University's Library system.

Photographs of Henrion's work featured at the Britain Can Make It Exhibition (1946) and The Festival of Britain (1951), have been made available on the Visual Arts Data Service (VADS), along with examples of his Wartime posters.

== Gallery ==
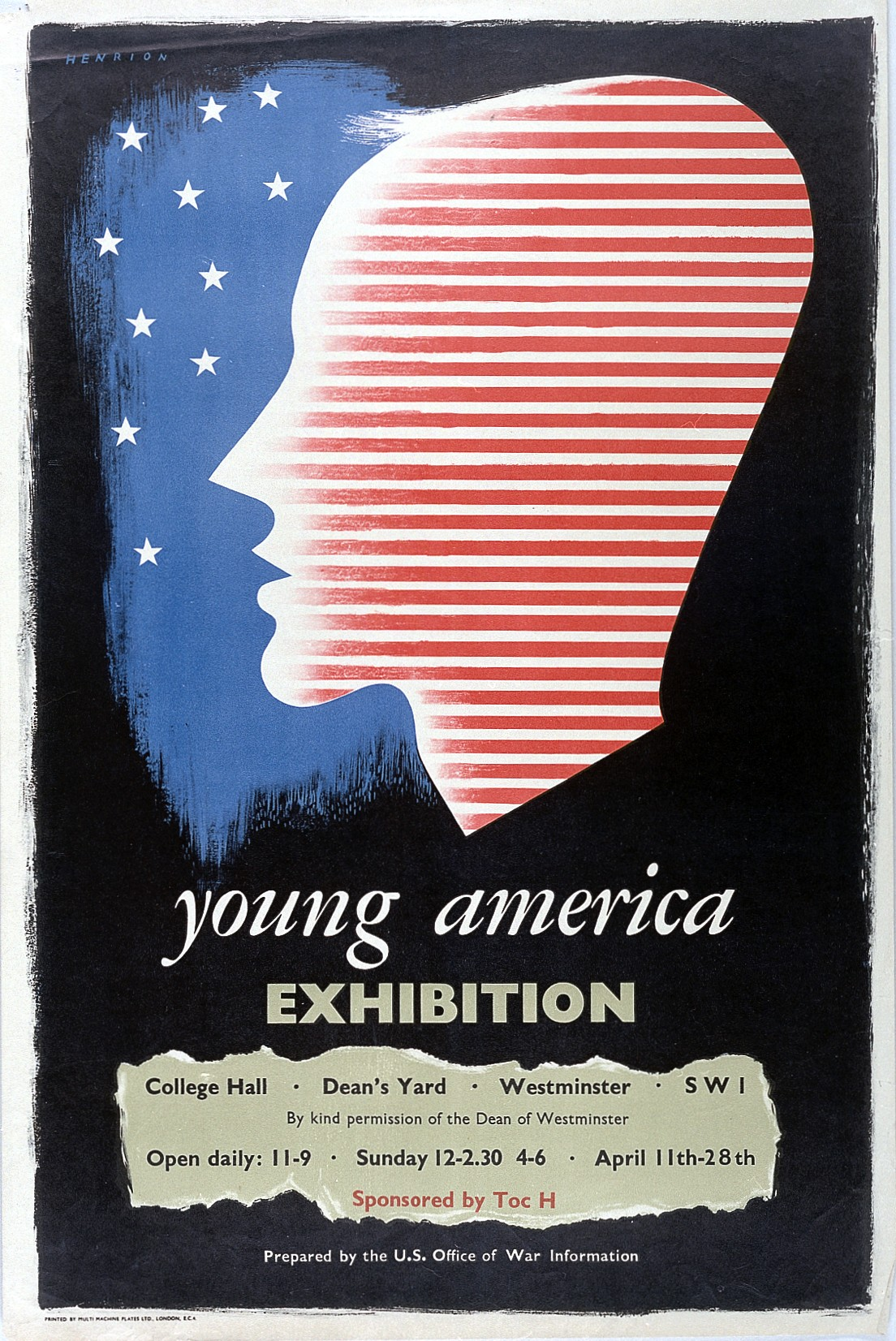
Profile of a young man in red stripes against a blue background Wellcome L0026427

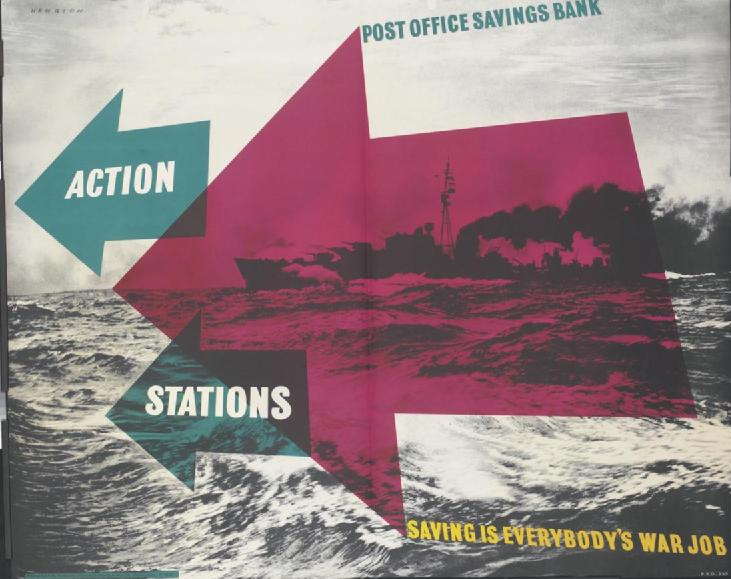
Action Stations Art.IWMPST16460

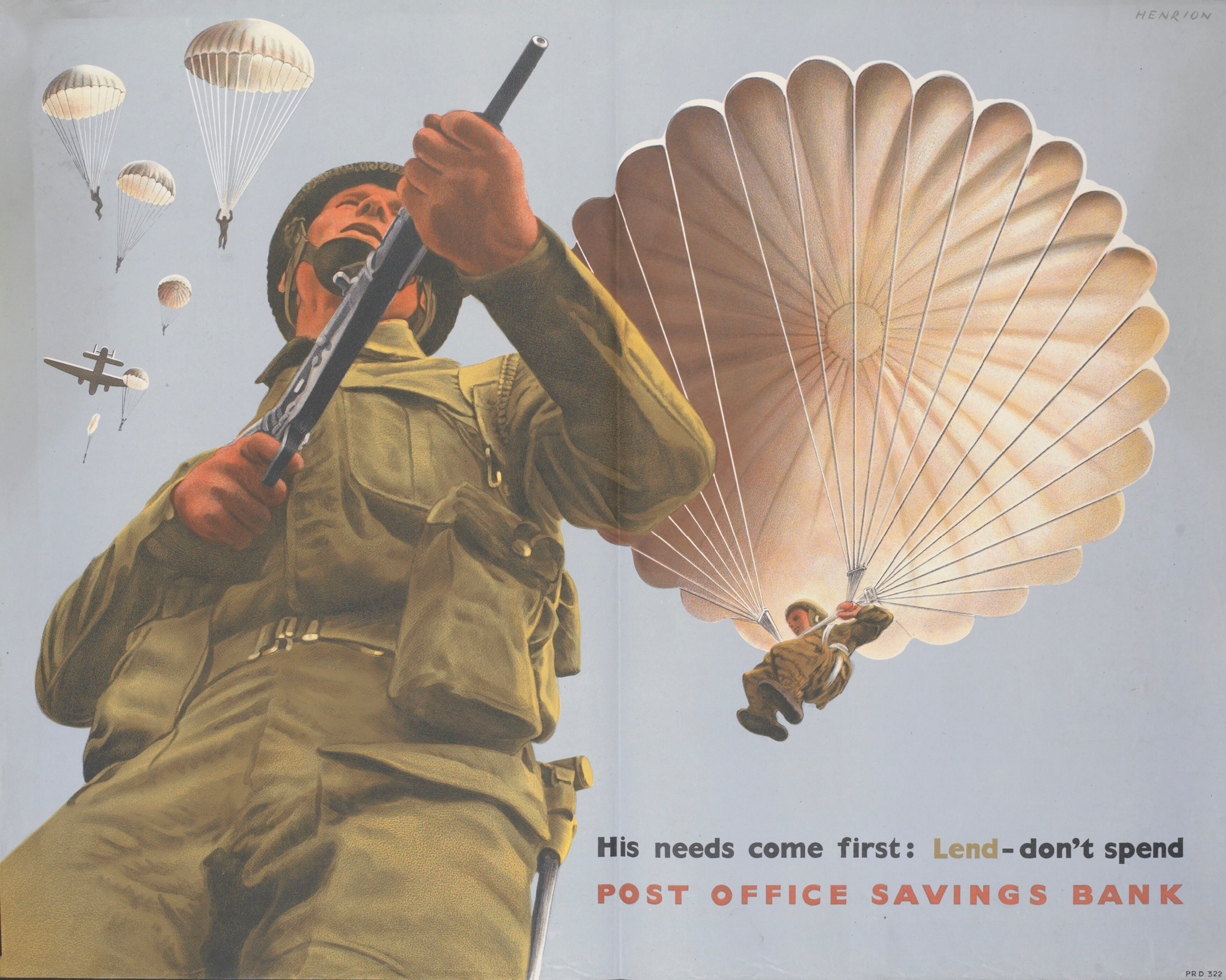
His Needs Come First Art.IWMPST16454

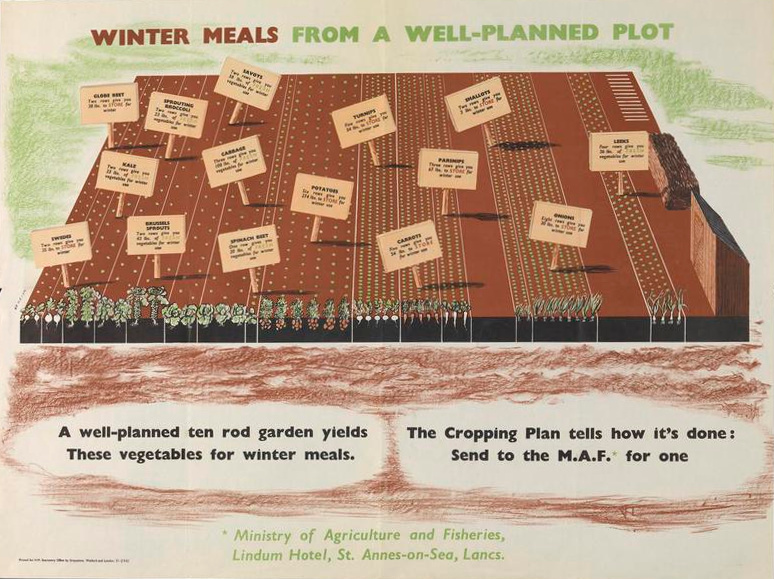
Winter Meals from a Well-planned Plot Art.IWMPST17019

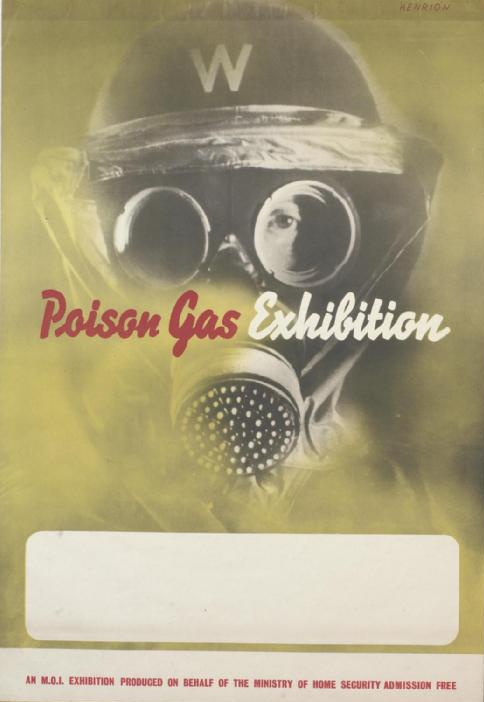
Poison Gas Exhibition Art.IWMPST3682
