= Arthur Koestler (book) =

Book by Mark Levene (1984)

- First U.S. edition book cover
- Author: Mark Levene
- Publisher: Frederick Ungar (US) and Oswald Wolff (UK)
- Pages: 176
- ISBN: 0-85496-086-4 (cloth); ISBN 0854960899 (paperback)
- OCLC: 12514430

Arthur Koestler is a book by Mark Levene about the life and work of Hungarian-British writer Arthur Koestler. The book was published in 1984, one year after Koestler's suicide. Until 2021, it was the only published monograph on Koestler's fiction.

The book is divided into seven main chapters, of which the first is a biography and the other six critical essays on each of Koestler's six novels, his stories and his play Twilight Bar.

The book functions as an introduction to Koestler's work, outlining plots and characters and identifying major thematic and structural questions. It presents Koestler as a committed intellectual, whether as a communist, anticommunist, Zionist, or student of the scientific mind.

The book was published by Frederick Ungar Publishing Co. in New York, 1984, and by Oswald Wolff (Publishers) in London, 1985, ISBN 0-85496-086-4 (cloth); ISBN 0-85496-089-9 (paperback).
