= Camp Vernet =

Concentration camp in Le Vernet, Ariège, France

- Concentration/Internment/Transit camp
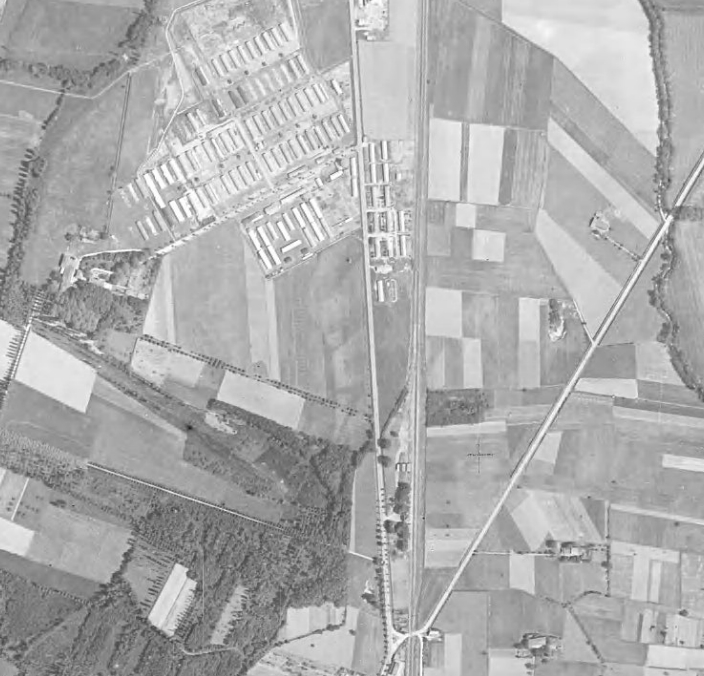
- Aerial photograph (1945)

- Location within France
- Coordinates: 43°11′43″N 1°36′30″E
- Location: Le Vernet, Occitania; Vichy France
- Operated by: French Police; German authorities
- Original use: Troop camp
- First built: 1918
- Operational: to June 1944
- Inmates: Spanish refugees, Jews, former members of the International Brigade
- Notable books: The Invisible Writing, Scum of the Earth

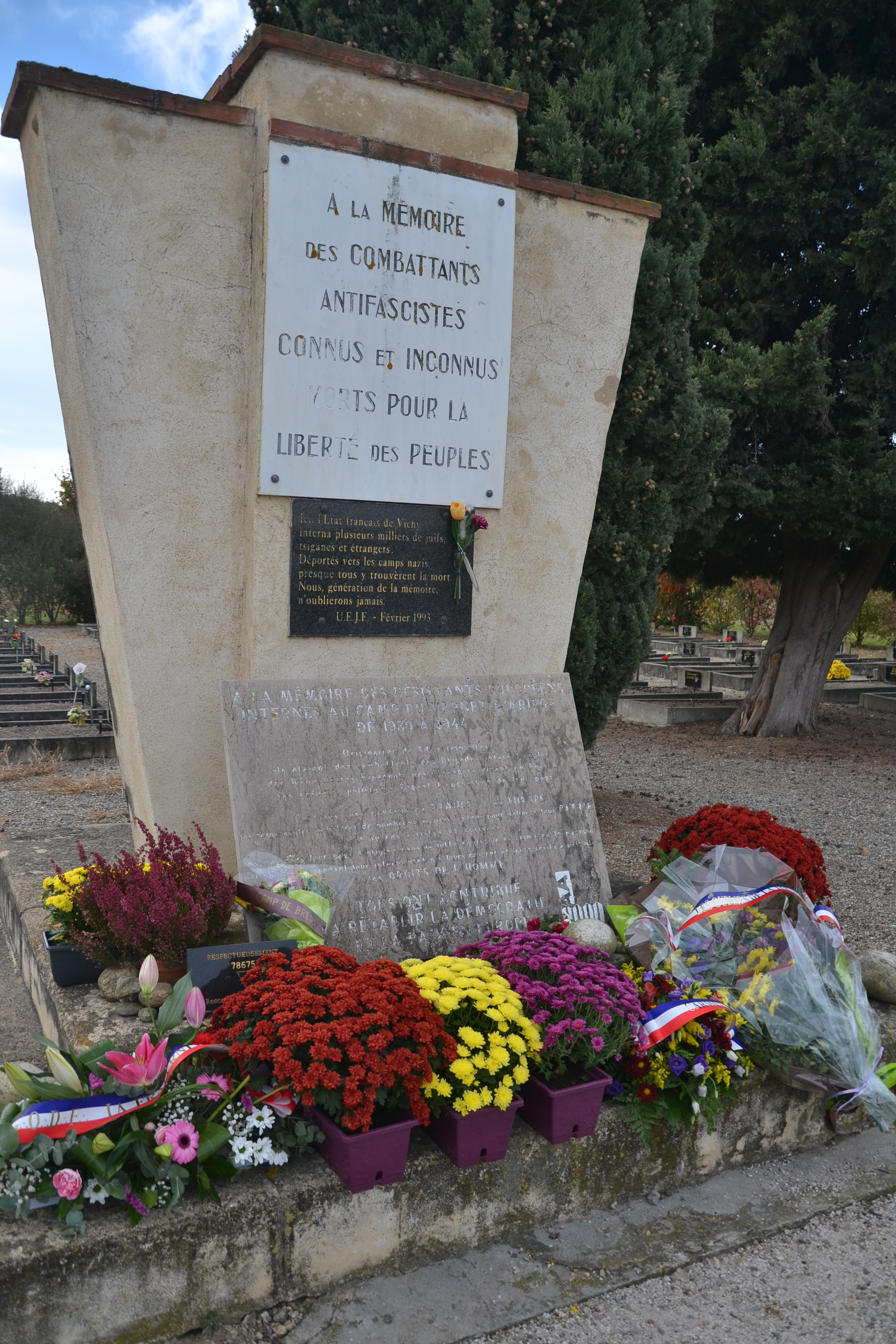
Memorial marker

Le Vernet Internment Camp, or Camp du Vernet, was a concentration camp in Le Vernet, Ariège, near Pamiers, in the French Pyrenees. It was built in 1918 as a barracks, but after World War I it was used as an internment camp for prisoners of war. From February 1939 to June 1944, it was used:

- first as an internment camp (concentration camp), first for Republican refugees (soldiers, their families, opponents of the Franco regime) fleeing Spain after Franco's victory in the Spanish Civil War: in particular some 12,000 refugees, including soldiers of the Durruti Column and others of the International Brigades;
- then, as of May–June 1940, under the Vichy government during German occupation in the Second World War. Starting in 1940, apart from the prisoners coming from the Spanish Civil War, the Vichy government used it to house prisoners considered suspect or dangerous to the government, including members of the resistance and opponents of the Hitler, Mussolini and Pétain regimes;
- then, from 1942 until June 1944, it was used as a holding camp for Jewish families awaiting deportation to other camps. The last transport out of the camp in June 1944 took the prisoners to Dachau concentration camp.

== History ==
The Camp du Vernet was originally built in June 1918 to house French colonial troops serving in World War I but when hostilities ceased it was used to hold German and Austrian prisoners of war.

Between the wars, it served as a military depot. Towards the end of the Spanish Civil War, in February 1939 in what was called La Retirada (the withdrawal), it was put to a new use until September 1939 as a reception camp for Republicans fleeing from Francisco Franco's armies after the collapse of the Second Spanish Republic. The camp held Republicans the French authorities deemed "a danger to public safety". At this time, it held mainly former soldiers from the Republican Durruti Column, the 26th Division and 150 International Brigades members, segregated in an area named "the leper colony". The camp covered an area of about 50 hectares, divided into three sections and surrounded by barbed wire fences.

With the outbreak of World War II, the role of the camp was expanded. It was used to house "undesirable" foreigners, in particular, anti-fascist intellectuals and former members of the International Brigades, particularly the more troublesome or senior veterans.

There is now a small museum at Le Vernet and Le Vernet features in Philip Kerr's 2010 novel Field Grey and in the 2012 novel Citadel by Kate Mosse, which follows the lives of a group of local people and resistance fighters.

== Operations under Vichy government ==
After the Fall of France on 25 June 1940, Camp Vernet was taken over by the pro-Nazi Vichy France authorities, to house "all foreigners considered suspect or dangerous to the public order". It then passed to the Germans, who rebuilt it according to their own concentration camp guidelines. Arthur Koestler was a prisoner there and declared that "from the point of view of food, installations and hygiene, Vernet was worse than a Nazi concentration camp". From 1942, Le Vernet was used as a holding centre for Jewish families awaiting deportation to Nazi labour and extermination camps. The final transport, in June 1944, took the remaining prisoners to Dachau concentration camp. One source says that "about 40,000 persons of 58 nationalities were interned in the camp".

== Notable prisoners ==
- Olof Aschberg
- Max Aub
- Erwin Blumenfeld
- Costa Chekrezi
- Leon Degrelle
- Louis Emrich
- Miguel García Vivancos
- Kurt Julius Goldstein
- Jesekiel David Kirszenbaum
- Arthur Koestler, who wrote about it in Scum of the Earth (1941) and The Invisible Writing.
- Nicolas Lazarévitch, libertarian-anarchist writer and activist
- Rudolf Leonhard, German playwright and communist
- Heinrich Rau
- Sascha Schapiro
- Michel Thomas, Polish Jew active in the French Résistance
- Leo Valiani, Italian historian
- Friedrich Wolf

== Sources ==
- (in English) Ariège history
- (in French) Ariège history, Chemins de Memoire

== See also ==
- List of Nazi-German concentration camps
- List of books about Nazi Germany
- List of concentration and internment camps
- List of Nazi-German concentration camps
- Nazi concentration camps
- World War II
