= Sonning Prize =

Danish culture award

The Sonning Prize (Danish: Sonningprisen) is a Danish culture prize awarded biennially for outstanding contributions to European culture. It is named after the Danish editor and author Carl Johan Sonning (1879–1937), who established the prize by his will.

A prize was first awarded in 1950 to Winston Churchill. However, a sequence of annual awards in this name was established in 1959 with the award to Albert Schweitzer followed by Bertrand Russell in 1960, the criterion being someone who "has accomplished meritorious work for the advancement of European civilization", and judged by a committee of the Senate of the University of Copenhagen. From 1971, it was awarded every second year.

Prize winners are chosen by a committee chaired by the rector of the University of Copenhagen which decides on laureates from a selection of candidates proposed by European universities. The prize amounts to DKK 1 million (~€135,000) and the award ceremony is always held on or around 19 April (Sonning's birthday) in Copenhagen.

== Sonning Prize laureates ==
| Year | Recipient | Lifespan | Occupation | Country |
|---|---|---|---|---|
| 1950 | Winston Churchill | 1874–1965 | Author and statesman | United Kingdom |
| 1959 | Albert Schweitzer | 1875–1965 | Philosopher and physician | France |
| 1960 | Bertrand Russell | 1872–1970 | Philosopher | United Kingdom |
| 1961 | Niels Bohr | 1885–1962 | Physicist | Denmark |
| 1962 | Alvar Aalto | 1898–1976 | Architect | Finland |
| 1963 | Karl Barth | 1886–1968 | Theologian | Switzerland |
| 1964 | Dominique Pire | 1910–1969 | Theologian and humanitarian | Belgium |
| 1965 | Richard von Coudenhove-Kalergi | 1894–1972 | Author and statesman | Austria |
| 1966 | Laurence Olivier | 1907–1989 | Actor | United Kingdom |
| 1967 | Willem Visser 't Hooft | 1900–1985 | Theologian | Netherlands |
| 1968 | Arthur Koestler | 1905–1983 | Author | United Kingdom |
| 1969 | Halldór Laxness | 1902–1998 | Author | Iceland |
| 1970 | Max Tau | 1897–1976 | Author | West Germany |
| 1971 | Danilo Dolci | 1924–1997 | Author and social activist | Italy |
| 1973 | Karl Popper | 1902–1994 | Philosopher | Austria |
| 1975 | Hannah Arendt | 1906–1975 | Author and politologist | West Germany |
| 1977 | Arne Næss | 1912–2009 | Philosopher | Norway |
| 1979 | Hermann Gmeiner | 1919–1986 | Philanthropist | Austria |
| 1981 | Dario Fo | 1926–2016 | Playwright | Italy |
| 1983 | Simone de Beauvoir | 1908–1986 | Author | France |
| 1985 | William Heinesen | 1900–1991 | Author | Faroe Islands |
| 1987 | Jürgen Habermas | 1929–2026 | Sociologist and philosopher | West Germany |
| 1989 | Ingmar Bergman | 1918–2007 | Film and theatre director | Sweden |
| 1991 | Václav Havel | 1936–2011 | Author and statesman | Czechoslovakia |
| 1994 | Krzysztof Kieślowski | 1941–1996 | Film director | Poland |
| 1996 | Günter Grass | 1927–2015 | Author | Germany |
| 1998 | Jørn Utzon | 1918–2008 | Architect | Denmark |
| 2000 | Eugenio Barba | b. 1936 | Author and theatre director | Italy |
| 2002 | Mary Robinson | b. 1944 | Politician | Ireland |
| 2004 | Mona Hatoum | b. 1952 | Video and installation artist | United Kingdom |
| 2006 | Ágnes Heller | 1929–2019 | Philosopher | Hungary |
| 2008 | Renzo Piano | b. 1937 | Architect | Italy |
| 2010 | Hans Magnus Enzensberger | 1929–2022 | Author | Germany |
| 2012 | Orhan Pamuk | b. 1952 | Author | Turkey |
| 2014 | Michael Haneke | b. 1942 | Film director | Austria |
| 2018 | Lars von Trier | b. 1956 | Film director | Denmark |
| 2021 | Svetlana Alexievich | b. 1948 | Author and dissident | Belarus |
| 2023 | Marina Abramović | b. 1946 | Performance artist | Serbia |
| 2025 | Hervé This | b. 1946 | Physical chemist | France |

== See also ==
- List of awards for contributions to culture
- List of European art awards
- Léonie Sonning Music Prize
