= Living with Koestler =

1985 book

Living with Koestler: Mamaine Koestler’s Letters 1945–51
- Author: Celia Goodman
- Genre: Biography
- Publisher: Weidenfeld & Nicolson
- Publication date: 1985
- Media type: Book/Hardcover
- Pages: 204 (including index) illustrated with B&W photographs
- ISBN: 0297785311
- OCLC: 11512855

Living with Koestler: Mamaine Koestler's Letters 1945–51 is a book about the author Arthur Koestler and Mamaine Paget, Koestler's second wife. More specifically, it is a selected compilation of Mamaine's letters to her twin sister Celia about her life with Koestler. The spontaneous and engaging letters reflect the intensity of her life with Koestler between 1945 and 1951.

The book was written and edited by Celia Goodman, née Paget. In a 22-page Introduction she provides brief biographical essays on Koestler and her sister Mamaine. In a Postscript she briefly describes Mamaine's sudden and unexpected death in 1954 in a London hospital as a result of an episode of acute asthma.
