= Marian Gobius =

Dutch sculptor

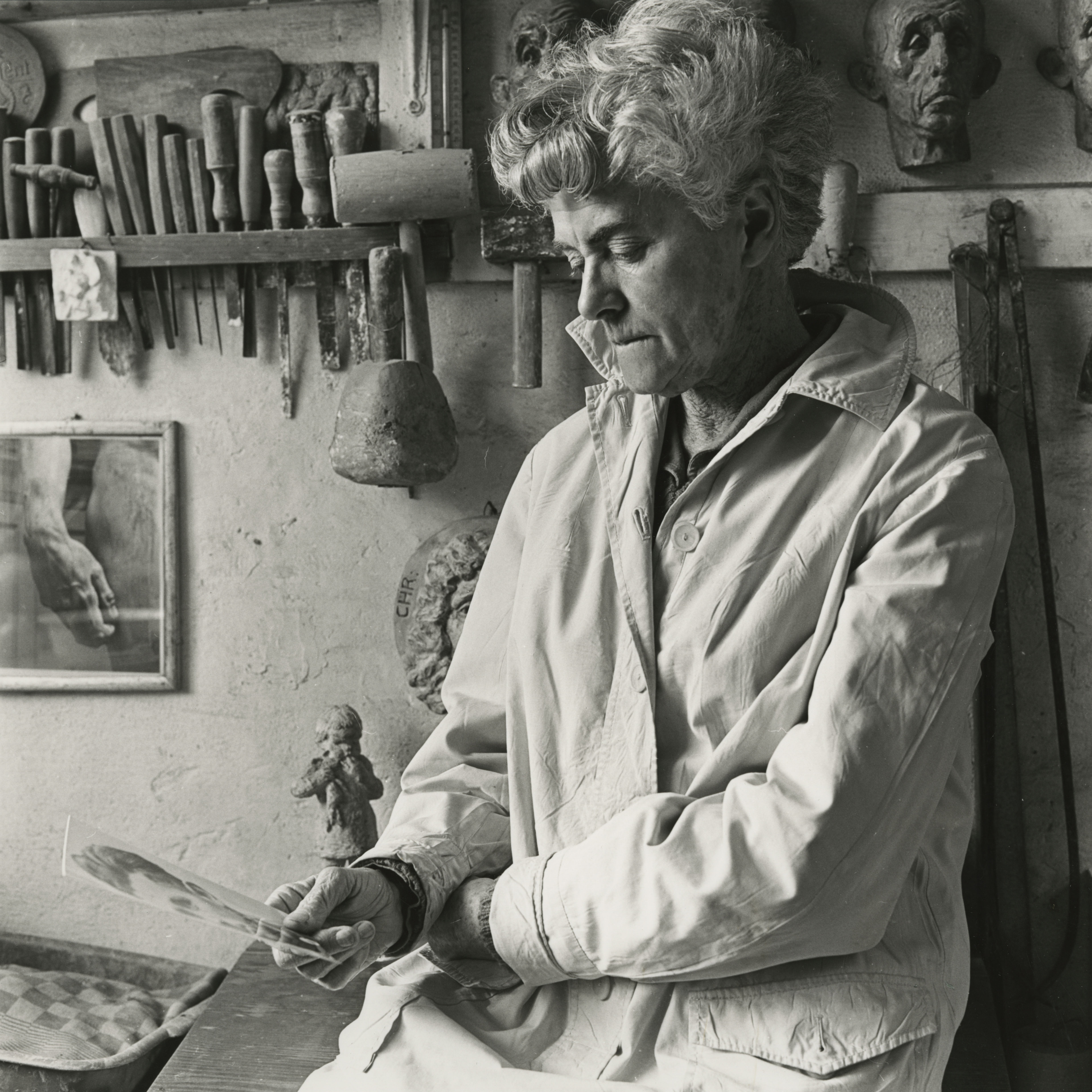
- Marian Gobius in 1979
- Born: 2 April 1910; Haarlem, Netherlands
- Died: 11 December 1994 (aged 84); Voorburg, Netherlands
- Occupation: Sculptor

Marian Gobius (2 April 1910 – 11 December 1994) was a Dutch sculptor. Her work was part of the art competitions at the 1932 Summer Olympics and the 1936 Summer Olympics.
