= Koestler Foundation =

The Koestler Foundation (originally the KIB) was a British organisation founded in 1980 to promote research in fields that fall outside of established science, specifically parapsychology and alternative medicine. The trustees were Arthur Koestler, Brian Inglis, Tony Bloomfield, Michael Fullerlove, and Sir William Wood. The foundation's original name derived from the initials of Koestler, Inglis and Bloomfield. The name was changed following the suicide death of Arthur Koestler in 1983.
