= The Invisible Writing =

1954 autobiography by Arthur Koestler

- Author: Arthur Koestler
- Publication date: 1954

The Invisible Writing: The Second Volume Of An Autobiography, 1932-40 (1954) is a book by Arthur Koestler.

It follows on from Arrow in the Blue, published two years earlier, and which described his life from his birth in 1905, to 1931, and deals with a much shorter period, a mere eight years (as opposed to the twenty six of the previous volume). This was nonetheless, a highly significant period in Koestler's life, as it involved his membership and subsequent alienation from the Communist movement.

As well as his relationship with Communism, The Invisible Writing is also interesting for its documentation of Europe in the years leading up to World War II, both his native Hungary and Austria, Germany, and also the west, such as Spain, France and England.

In The Invisible Writing, Koestler recalls that during the summer of 1935 he "wrote about half of a satirical novel called The Good Soldier Schweik Goes to War Again..... It had been commissioned by Willy Münzenberg [the Comintern's chief propagandist in the West ... but was vetoed by the Party on the grounds of the book's 'pacifist errors'..." (p. 283).

Much of the experiences in this book, were also to be found in some form elsewhere:

- Koestler's incarceration in the Spanish Civil War, by the Phalange – documented in Spanish Testament (1937), and revised 1942 as Dialogue with Death, and which formed part of the basis for his novel Darkness at Noon (1940).
- Scum of the Earth was a very lightly fictionalised account of his detention at Camp Vernet, and subsequent escape in the pre-World War II period.
- Koestler's experiences with Communism were also discussed by him in the anti-Communist The God that Failed (1949), which collected the testimonies of several ex-Communists.
- Von Weissen Nächten und Roten Tagen ("From White Nights and Red Days"), published in 1933, also recounts some of the early period of this book. It is very difficult to find, being mostly published in the Soviet Union, and long out of print. It is nonetheless significant as Koestler's first published book.
