= Stranger on the Square =

Book by Arthur Koestler

- First edition
- Editor: Harold Harris
- Author: Arthur Koestler
- Language: English
- Genre: Autobiography
- Publisher: Hutchinson
- Publication date: 1984
- Publication place: United Kingdom
- ISBN: 0-09-154330-4

Stranger on the Square is the third volume of Arthur Koestler's autobiography, published posthumously in 1984. It was co-authored with his wife Cynthia Koestler, née Jefferies, and includes autobiographical notes of her as well. The book was published by Hutchinson, London 1984, 242 pages including Index. ISBN 0-09-154330-4. It was edited by Harold Harris, who wrote the Introduction and Epilogue. He was Koestler's editor for many years. The book is illustrated with seven monochrome photographs plus a colour and another monochrome photograph on the dustcover.

The structure of the book is unusual. Part One 1940–1951, has six chapters whose authors are Arthur Koestler and Cynthia Koestler, alternately. Part Two 1951–1956, also consists of six chapters, all by Cynthia Koestler, followed by an Epilogue written by Harold Harris, an Appendix by Arthur Koestler, and an Index.
