= Holon (philosophy) =

Something that is simultaneously a whole and a part

A holon is something that is simultaneously a whole in and of itself, as well as a part of a larger whole. In this way, a holon can be considered a subsystem within a larger hierarchical system. An individual holon is also made up of constituent parts. In this way holons can be seen as having three aspects: (1) the whole self-contained thing itself,(2) it is made up of parts, and (3) it is also a part of something larger. A bias of only seeing what parts a thing is made up of in order to understand its nature is at the heart of reductionism. A bias of seeing only what a thing is a part of is gaiaism. A holon can be seen as an object within a recursive field, a whole, made of parts, and part of something larger.

The holon represents a way to overcome the dichotomy between parts and wholes, as well as a way to account for both the self-assertive and the integrative tendencies of organisms.

Holons are sometimes discussed in the context of self-organizing holarchic open (SOHO) systems.

== Etymology ==
The word holon (Ancient Greek: ὅλον) is a combination of the Greek holos (ὅλος) meaning 'whole', with the suffix -on which denotes a particle or part (as in proton and neutron). Holons are self-reliant units that possess a degree of independence and can handle contingencies without asking higher authorities for instructions (i.e., they have a degree of autonomy). These holons are also simultaneously subject to control from one or more of these higher authorities. The first property ensures that holons are stable forms that are able to withstand disturbances, while the latter property signifies that they are intermediate forms, providing a context for the proper functionality for the larger whole.

== History ==
The term holon was coined by Arthur Koestler in The Ghost in the Machine (1967), though Koestler first articulated the concept in The Act of Creation (1964), in which he refers to the relationship between the searches for subjective and objective knowledge:

Einstein's space is no closer to reality than Van Gogh's sky. The glory of science is not in a truth more absolute than the truth of Bach or Tolstoy, but in the act of creation itself. The scientist's discoveries impose his own order on chaos, as the composer or painter imposes his; an order that always refers to limited aspects of reality, and is based on the observer's frame of reference, which differs from period to period as a Rembrant nude differs from a nude by Manet.

Koestler would finally propose the term holon in The Ghost in the Machine (1967), using it to describe natural organisms as composed of semi-autonomous sub-wholes (or, parts) that are linked in a form of hierarchy, a holarchy, to form a whole. The title of the book itself points to the notion that the entire 'machine' of life and of the universe itself is ever-evolving toward more and more complex states, as if a ghost were operating the machine.

The first observation was influenced by a story told to him by Herbert A. Simon—the 'parable of the two watchmakers'—in which Simon concludes that complex systems evolve from simple systems much more rapidly when there are stable intermediate forms present in the evolutionary process compared to when they are not present:

There once were two watchmakers, named Bios and Mekhos, who made very fine watches. The phones in their workshops rang frequently; new customers were constantly calling them. However, Bios prospered while Mekhos became poorer and poorer. In the end, Mekhos lost his shop and worked as a mechanic for Bios. What was the reason behind this?

The watches consisted of about 1000 parts each. The watches that Mekhos made were designed such that, when he had to put down a partly assembled watch (for instance, to answer the phone), it immediately fell into pieces and had to be completely reassembled from the basic elements. On the other hand Bios designed his watches so that he could put together subassemblies of about ten components each. Ten of these subassemblies could be put together to make a larger sub-assembly. Finally, ten of the larger subassemblies constituted the whole watch. When Bios had to put his watches down to attend to some interruption they did not break up into their elemental parts but only into their sub-assemblies.

Now, the watchmakers were each disturbed at the same rate of once per hundred assembly operations. However, due to their different assembly methods, it took Mekhos four thousand times longer than Bios to complete a single watch.

— Herbert Simon, quoted by Arthur Koestler (1967)

The second observation was made by Koestler himself in his analysis of hierarchies and stable intermediate forms in non-living matter (atomic and molecular structure), living organisms, and social organizations.

== See also ==
- Assembly theory
- Dualism
- Holism
- Unity of opposites
