= Arrow in the Blue =

1952 autobiography by Arthur Koestler

- First edition dust cover
- Author: Arthur Koestler
- Genre: Autobiography
- Publisher: Collins with Hamish Hamilton
- Publication date: 1952
- Pages: 307 (cloth bound)
- Followed by: The Invisible Writing

Arrow in the Blue is an autobiography covering the first 26 years of Arthur Koestler's life (1905–1931). It was published in 1952 by Collins with Hamish Hamilton Ltd. and has been reprinted several times.

== The book and its contents ==
The first edition was cloth-bound and measured 210mm x 140mm, 307 pages, including four monochrome illustrations. (No ISBN)

The book is divided into five chronological Parts:

- 1905-1921
- 1922-1926
- 1926-1927
- 1927-1930
- 1930-1931

Each Part deals with a different phase in the author's life.

The book covers the period from his birth in 1905 in Budapest, the dual capital of the Austro-Hungarian Monarchy, to 1931, when he joined the Communist Party of Germany. During these first twenty-six years of his life he was, among other things, a member of a Zionist duelling fraternity at the University of Vienna, a worker on a collective farm in Palestine, a street-vendor of lemonade in Haifa, editor of a newspaper in Cairo, foreign correspondent of the biggest Continental news agency in Paris and the Middle East, science editor of Ullstein Verlag, the pre-eminent publishing house in Germany, and a member of the North Pole expedition of the Graf Zeppelin

The book has three main themes: the historical background, personal adventure and the psychological analysis of his own spiritual development.
