= Arthur Koestler =

Hungarian-British author and journalist (1905–1983)

Arthur Koestler CBE
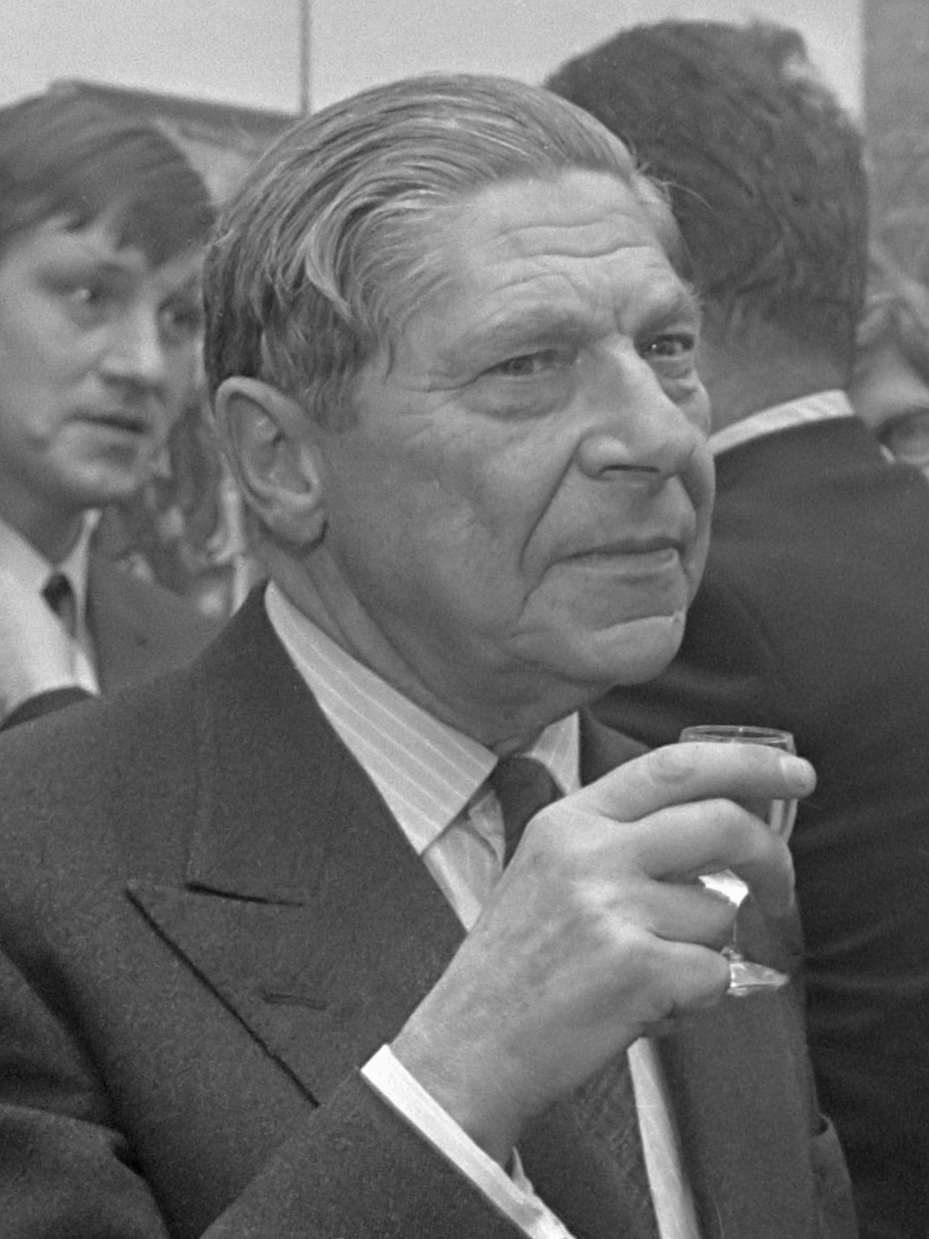
- Koestler in 1969
- Born: Kösztler Artúr; 5 September 1905; Budapest, Austria-Hungary
- Died: 1 March 1983 (aged 77); London, England
- Education: University of Vienna
- Occupations: Novelist; essayist; journalist
- Spouses: Dorothy Ascher (1935–1950); Mamaine Paget (1950–1952); Cynthia Jefferies (1965–1983)
- Writing career
- Period: 1934–1983
- Subjects: Fiction, non-fiction, history, autobiography, politics, philosophy, psychology, parapsychology, science
- Notable works: Darkness at Noon (1940); The Sleepwalkers (1959); The Thirteenth Tribe (1976)
- Notable awards: Sonning Prize (1968); CBE (1972)

Arthur Koestler (Note: UK: /ˈkɜːstlər/, US: /ˈkɛst-/; German: [ˈaʁtuːɐ̯ ˈkœstlɐ]; Hungarian: Kösztler Artúr [ˈkøstlɛr ˈɒrtuːr]) CBE (5 September 1905 – 1 March 1983) was an Austro-Hungarian-born author and journalist. Koestler was born in Budapest, and was educated in Austria, apart from his early school years. In 1931, Koestler joined the Communist Party of Germany but resigned in 1938 after becoming disillusioned with Stalinism.

Having moved to Britain in 1940, Koestler published his novel Darkness at Noon, an anti-totalitarian work that gained him international fame. Over the next 43 years, Koestler espoused many political causes and wrote novels, memoirs, biographies, and numerous essays. In 1949, Koestler began secretly working with a British Cold War anti-communist propaganda department known as the Information Research Department (IRD), which would republish and distribute many of his works, and also fund his activities. In 1968, he was awarded the Sonning Prize "for [his] outstanding contribution to European culture". In 1972, he was made a Commander of the Order of the British Empire (CBE).

In 1976, Koestler was diagnosed with Parkinson's disease and in 1979 with terminal leukaemia. On 1 March 1983, Koestler and his wife Cynthia died of suicide together at their London home by swallowing lethal quantities of barbiturate-based Tuinal capsules.

== Life ==
[Koestler] began his education in the twilight of the Austro-Hungarian Empire, at an experimental kindergarten in Budapest. His mother was briefly a patient of Sigmund Freud. In interwar Vienna he wound up as the personal secretary of Vladimir Jabotinsky, one of the early leaders of the Zionist movement. Travelling in Soviet Turkmenistan as a young and ardent Communist, he ran into Langston Hughes. While reporting on the Spanish Civil War, he met W. H. Auden at a "crazy party" in Valencia before winding up in one of Franco's prisons. In Weimar Berlin he fell into the circle of the Comintern agent Willi Münzenberg, through whom he met the leading German Communists [and fellow-travellers] of the era, including Johannes Becher, Hanns Eisler and Bertolt Brecht. Afraid of being caught by the Gestapo while fleeing France, he borrowed suicide pills from Walter Benjamin. He took them several weeks later when it seemed he would be unable to get out of Lisbon, but he did not die. Along the way he had lunch with Heinrich Mann, got drunk with Dylan Thomas, made friends with George Orwell, flirted with Mary McCarthy and lived in Cyril Connolly's London flat. In 1940 Koestler was released from a French detention camp, partly thanks to the intervention of Harold Nicolson and Noël Coward. In the 1950s he helped to found the Congress for Cultural Freedom, together with Melvin Lasky and Sidney Hook. In the 1960s he took LSD with Timothy Leary. In the 1970s he was still giving lectures that impressed, among others, the young Salman Rushdie.

— Anne Applebaum, reviewing Michael Scammell: Koestler: The Literary and Political Odyssey of a Twentieth-Century Skeptic

=== Family and early life ===
Koestler was born in Budapest to Jewish parents Henrik and Adele Koestler (née Jeiteles). Henrik's father, Lipót Koestler, was a soldier in the Austro-Hungarian Army. In 1861, Lipót married Karolina Schon, the daughter of a prosperous timber merchant, and their son Henrik was born on 18 August 1869 in the town of Miskolc in northeastern Hungary. Henrik left school at age 16 and took a job as an errand boy with a firm of drapers. He taught himself English, German, and French, and eventually became a partner in the firm. He later set up his own business importing textiles into Hungary.

Koestler's mother, Adele Jeiteles, was born on 25 June 1871 into a prominent Jewish family in Prague. Among her ancestors was Jonas Mischel Loeb Jeitteles, a prominent 18th-century physician and essayist, whose son Judah Jeitteles became a well-known poet—Beethoven set some of his poems to music. Adele's father, Jacob Jeiteles, moved the family to Vienna, where she grew up in relative prosperity until about 1890. Faced with financial difficulties, Jacob abandoned his wife and daughter and emigrated to the United States. Adele and her mother moved from Vienna to Budapest to stay with Adele's older married sister.

Henrik and Adele met in 1898 and married in 1900. Arthur, their only child, was born on 5 September 1905. The Koestlers lived in spacious, well-furnished, rented apartments in various predominantly Jewish districts of Budapest. During Arthur's early years, they employed a cook-housekeeper as well as a foreign governess. His primary school education started at an experimental private kindergarten founded by Laura Striker (née Polányi). Her daughter Eva Striker later became Koestler's lover, and they remained friends all his life.

The outbreak of World War I in 1914 deprived Koestler's father of foreign suppliers, and his business collapsed. Facing destitution, the family moved temporarily to a boarding house in Vienna. When the war ended, the family returned to Budapest. As noted in Koestler's autobiography, he and his family were sympathetic to the short-lived Hungarian Bolshevik Revolution of 1919. Although the small soap factory owned at the time by Koestler's father was nationalised, the elder Koestler was appointed its director by the revolutionary government and was well-paid. Even though the autobiography was published in 1953, after Koestler had become an outspoken anti-communist, he wrote favourably of the Hungarian Communists and their leader Béla Kun. He fondly recalled the hopes for a better future he had felt as a teenager in revolutionary Budapest.

The Koestlers later witnessed the temporary occupation of Budapest by the Romanian Army and then the White Terror under the right-wing regime of Admiral Horthy. In 1920, the family returned to Vienna, where Henrik set up a successful new import business.

In September 1922, Koestler enrolled in the University of Vienna to study engineering, and joined the Zionist duelling student fraternity Unitas. When Henrik's latest business failed, Koestler stopped attending lectures and was expelled for non-payment of fees. In March 1926, he wrote a letter to his parents telling them he was going to Mandate Palestine for a year to work as an assistant engineer in a factory to gain experience and help him obtain a job in Austria. On 1 April 1926, he left Vienna for Palestine.

=== Palestine, Paris, Berlin, and polar flight, 1926–1931 ===
For a few weeks, Koestler lived in a kibbutz, but his application to join the collective (Kvutzat Heftziba) was rejected by its members. For the next twelve months, he supported himself with menial jobs in Haifa, Tel Aviv, and Jerusalem. Frequently penniless and starving, he depended on friends and acquaintances for survival. He occasionally wrote or edited broadsheets and other publications, mainly in German. In early 1927, he left Palestine briefly for Berlin, where he ran the secretariat of Ze'ev Jabotinsky's revisionist Zionist party Hatzohar.

Later that year, through a friend, Koestler obtained the position of Middle East correspondent for the prestigious Berlin-based Ullstein-Verlag group of newspapers. He returned to Jerusalem, where he produced detailed political essays and some lighter reportage for his principal employer and other newspapers for the next two years. He was a resident at 29 Rehov Hanevi'im in Jerusalem. He travelled extensively, interviewed heads of state, kings, presidents, and prime ministers, and greatly enhanced his reputation as a journalist. As noted in his autobiography, he came to realise that he would never really fit into Palestine's Zionist Jewish community, the Yishuv, and particularly that he would not be able to have a journalistic career in Hebrew.

In June 1929, while on leave in Berlin, Koestler successfully lobbied at Ullstein for a transfer away from Palestine. In September 1929, he was sent to Paris to fill a vacancy in the bureau of the Ullstein News Service. In 1931, he was called to Berlin and appointed science editor of the Vossische Zeitung and science adviser to the Ullstein newspaper empire. In July 1931, he was Ullstein's choice to represent the paper on board the Graf Zeppelin's week-long polar flight, which carried a team of scientists and the polar aviator Lincoln Ellsworth to 82 degrees North and back. Koestler was the only journalist on board: his live wireless broadcasts and subsequent articles and lecture tours throughout Europe brought him further attention. Soon afterwards he was appointed foreign editor and assistant editor-in-chief of the mass-circulation Berliner Zeitung am Mittag.

In 1931, Koestler, encouraged by Eva Striker and impressed by the achievements of the Soviet Union, became a supporter of Marxism–Leninism. On 31 December 1931, he applied for membership in the Communist Party of Germany. As noted in his biography, he was disappointed in the conduct of the Vossische Zeitung, "The Flagship of German Liberalism", which adapted to changing times by firing Jewish journalists, hiring writers with marked German nationalist views, and dropping its longstanding campaign against capital punishment. Koestler concluded that Liberals and moderate Democrats could not stand up against the rising Nazi tide and that the Communists were the only real counter-force.

=== 1930s ===
In the early 1930s, Koestler moved to the Soviet Union. In 1932, Koestler travelled in Turkmenistan and Central Asia, where he met and traveled with Langston Hughes. During his stay in the Soviet Union, he also lived for a time in the Ukrainian Soviet Socialist Republic, alongside physicist and writer Alexander Weissberg. At the time, the Ukrainian SSR was in the middle of a catastrophic man-made famine. Much later, he would describe how in the train station of Kharkiv, "[Ukrainian peasant women] held up to the carriage windows horrible infants with enormous wobbling heads, sticklike limbs, and swollen, pointed bellies" as a result of the widespread malnutrition. Nevertheless, at this time, he remained a convinced Soviet sympathiser, and echoing the official version of events by the Soviet government, he claimed that those starving were "enemies of the people who preferred begging to work." Koestler wrote a book on the Soviet Five-Year Plan that did not meet with the approval of the Soviet authorities and was never published in Russian. Only the German version, extensively censored, was published in an edition for German-speaking Soviet citizens.

As a result of Adolf Hitler's rise to power in January 1933, Koestler could no longer visit Germany. Koestler left the Soviet Union in 1933, and in September of that year, he returned to Paris and, for the next two years, was active in anti-fascist movements. He wrote propaganda under the direction of Willi Münzenberg, the Comintern's chief propaganda director in the West. In 1935, Koestler married Dorothy Ascher (1905−1992), a fellow communist activist. They separated amicably in 1937.

In 1936, during the Spanish Civil War, Koestler undertook a visit to General Francisco Franco's headquarters in Seville on behalf of the Comintern, pretending to be a Franco sympathiser and using credentials from the London daily News Chronicle as cover. He collected evidence of the direct involvement of Fascist Italy and Nazi Germany on Franco's side, which at that time the Nationalist rebels were still trying to conceal. He had to escape after he was recognised and denounced as a communist by a former German colleague. Back in France, he wrote L'Espagne Ensanglantée, which was later incorporated into his book Spanish Testament. Within Spanish Testament, while in prison, Koestler described his belief in "the Socialist conception of the future of humanity"; in other words, "to given [sic] workers chance".

In 1937, Koestler returned to Spain on the side of the Republicans as a war correspondent for the News Chronicle and was in Málaga when it fell to Benito Mussolini's troops, who were fighting on the side of the Nationalists. He took refuge in the house of retired zoologist Sir Peter Chalmers Mitchell, and they were both arrested by Franco's chief propagandist, Luis Bolín, who had sworn that if he ever got his hands on Koestler, he would "shoot him like a dog". From February until June, Koestler was imprisoned in Seville under sentence of death. He was eventually exchanged for a "high value" Nationalist prisoner held by the Republicans, the wife of one of Franco's ace fighter pilots. Koestler was one of the few authors to have been sentenced to death, an experience he wrote about in Dialogue with Death. As he noted in his autobiography, his estranged wife Dorothy Ascher had greatly contributed to saving his life by intensive, months-long lobbying on his behalf in Britain. When he went to Britain after his release, the couple tried to resume their marriage, but Koestler's gratitude to her proved an insufficient foundation for a daily life together. Koestler returned to France, where he agreed to write a sex encyclopaedia to earn money to live on. It was published with great success under the title The Encyclopœdia of Sexual Knowledge, under the pseudonyms of "Drs A. Costler, A. Willy, and Others".

In July 1938, Koestler finished work on his novel The Gladiators. Later that year, he resigned from the Communist Party and started work on a new novel, which was published in London under the title Darkness at Noon (1941). Also in 1938, he became editor of Die Zukunft (The Future), a German-language weekly published in Paris. Koestler's breaking with the Communist Party may have been influenced by the similar step taken by his fellow activist Willi Münzenberg. In 1939, Koestler met and formed an attachment to the British sculptor Daphne Hardy. They lived together in Paris, and she translated the manuscript of Darkness at Noon from German into English in early 1940. She smuggled it out of France when they left ahead of the German occupation and arranged for its publication after reaching London that year.

=== War years ===
After the outbreak of World War II, Koestler returned from the South of France to Paris. He attempted to turn himself in to the authorities as a foreign national several times and was finally arrested on 2 October 1939. The French government first detained Koestler at Stade Roland Garros until he was moved to Le Vernet Internment Camp among other "undesirable aliens", most of them refugees. He was released in early 1940 due to strong British pressure. Milicent Bagot, an intelligence officer at MI5, recommended his release from Camp Vernet but said that he should not be granted a British visa. (John le Carré used Bagot as a model for Connie Sachs in his spy novels featuring "George Smiley". Bagot was the first to warn that Kim Philby of MI6 was probably spying for the USSR.) Koestler describes the period 1939 to 1940 and his incarceration in Le Vernet in his memoir Scum of the Earth.

Shortly before the German invasion of France, Koestler joined the French Foreign Legion to get out of the country. He deserted in North Africa and tried to return to England. He heard a false report that the ship Hardy was travelling upon had sunk and that she and his manuscript were lost. He attempted suicide but survived. Arriving in the UK without an entry permit, Koestler was imprisoned pending examination of his case. He was still in prison when Daphne Hardy's English translation of his book Darkness at Noon was published in early 1941. Immediately after Koestler was released, he volunteered for Army service. While awaiting his call-up papers, between January and March 1941, he wrote his memoir Scum of the Earth, the first book he wrote in English. He served in the Pioneer Corps for the next twelve months.

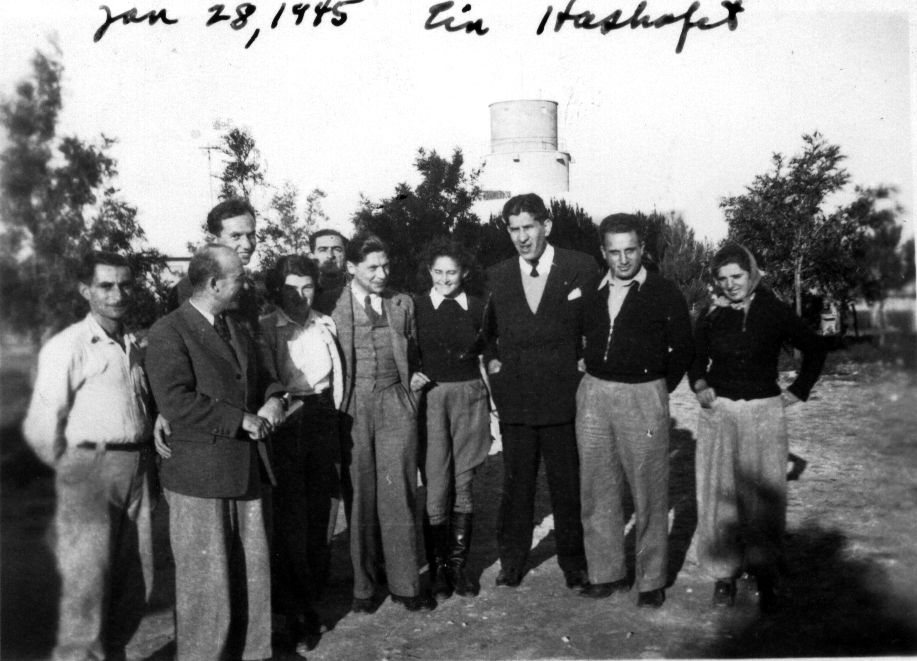
Kibbutz Ein HaShofet in January 1945. Koestler is fifth from the right.

In March 1942, Koestler was assigned to the Ministry of Information, where he worked as a scriptwriter for propaganda broadcasts and films. In his spare time, he wrote Arrival and Departure, the third in his trilogy of novels that included Darkness at Noon. He also wrote several essays, which were subsequently collected and published in The Yogi and the Commissar. One of the essays, titled "On Disbelieving Atrocities" (originally published in The New York Times), was about the Nazi atrocities against the Jews. Daphne Hardy, who had been doing war work in Oxford, joined Koestler in London in 1943, but they parted company a few months later. They remained good friends until Koestler's death.

In December 1944, Koestler traveled to Palestine with accreditation from The Times. There he had a clandestine meeting with Menachem Begin, the head of the Irgun paramilitary organisation, who was wanted by the British and had a 500-pound bounty on his head. Koestler tried to persuade him to abandon militant attacks and accept a two-state solution for Palestine but failed. Many years later, Koestler wrote in his memoirs: "When the meeting was over, I realised how naïve I had been to imagine that my arguments would have even the slightest influence."

Staying in Palestine until August 1945, Koestler collected material for his next novel, Thieves in the Night. When he returned to England, Mamaine Paget, whom he had started to see before going out to Palestine, was waiting for him. In August 1945, the couple moved to the cottage of Bwlch Ocyn, an isolated farmhouse owned by Clough Williams-Ellis, in the Vale of Ffestiniog. Over the next three years, Koestler became a close friend of writer George Orwell. The region had its own intellectual circle, which would have been sympathetic to Koestler: Williams Ellis's wife, Amabel, a niece of Lytton Strachey, was also a former communist; other associates included Rupert Crawshay-Williams, Michael Polanyi, Storm Jameson and, most significantly, Bertrand Russell, who lived close by.

=== Post-war years ===
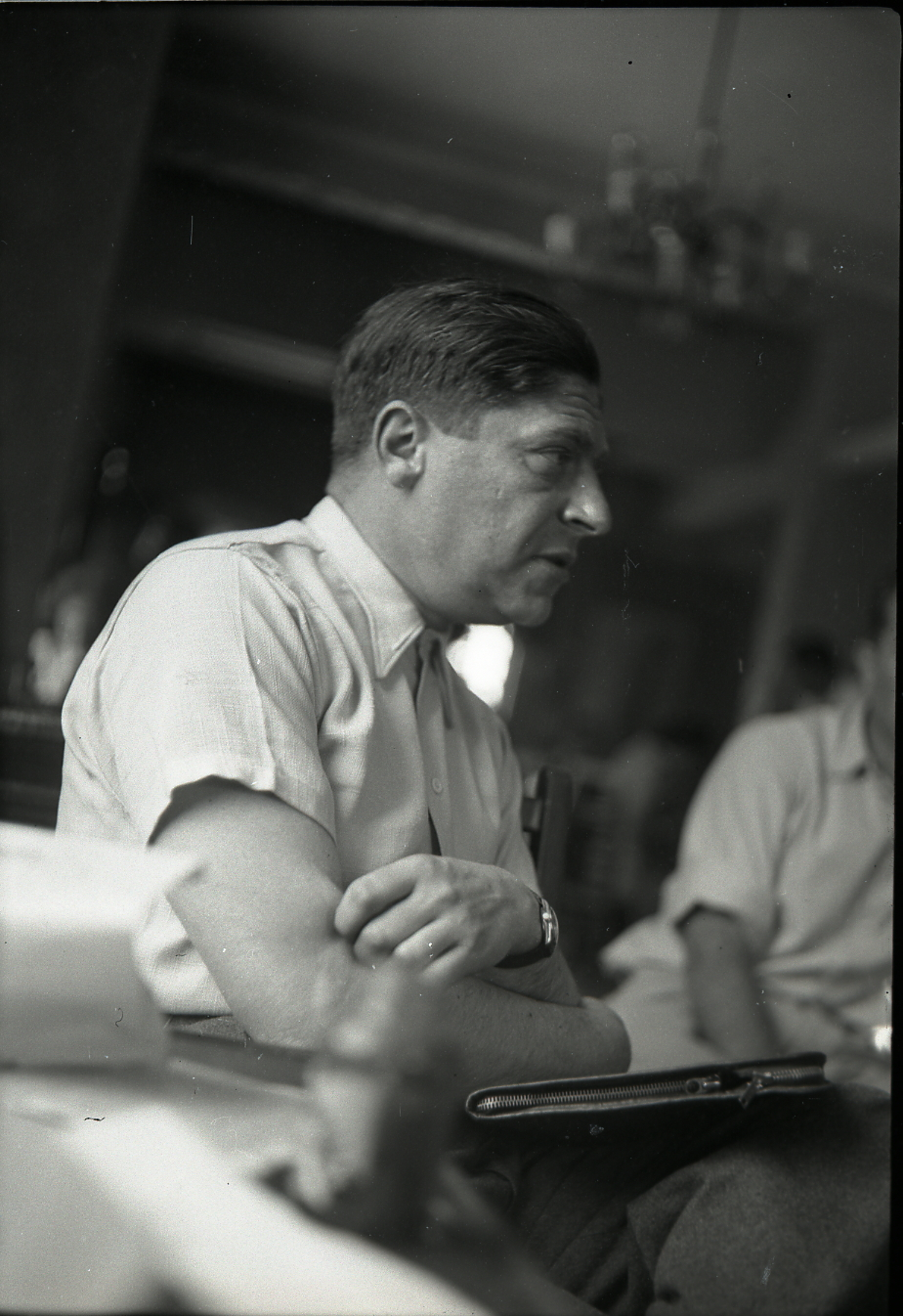
Koestler in Tel Aviv in 1949

In 1948, when war broke out between the newly declared State of Israel and the neighbouring Arab states, Koestler was accredited by several newspapers, American, British, and French, and travelled to Israel. Mamaine Paget went with him. They arrived in Israel on 4 June and stayed there until October. Later that year, they left the UK for a while and moved to France. News that his long-pending application for British nationality had been granted reached him in France in late December; early in 1949, he returned to London to swear the oath of allegiance to the British Crown.

In January 1949, Koestler and Paget moved to a house he had bought in France. There, he wrote a contribution to The God That Failed and finished work on Promise and Fulfilment: Palestine 1917−1949. The latter book received poor reviews in both the U.S. and the UK. In 1949, he also published the non-fiction book Insight and Outlook. This, too, received lukewarm reviews. In July, Koestler began work on Arrow in the Blue, the first volume of his autobiography. He hired a new part-time secretary, Cynthia Jefferies, who replaced Daphne Woodward. Cynthia and Koestler eventually married. In the autumn, he started work on The Age of Longing, which he continued to work until mid-1950. Koestler had reached an agreement with his first wife, Dorothy, on an amicable divorce, and their marriage was dissolved on 15 December 1949. This cleared the way for his marriage to Mamaine Paget, which took place on 15 April 1950 at the British Consulate in Paris.

In June 1950, Koestler delivered a major anti-communist speech in Berlin under the auspices of the Congress for Cultural Freedom, an organisation funded (though he asserted that he did not know this) by the Central Intelligence Agency (CIA) of the United States. In the autumn, he went to the United States on a lecture tour, during which he lobbied for permanent resident status in the U.S. At the end of October, on impulse, he bought Island Farm, a small island with a house on it on the Delaware River near New Hope, Pennsylvania. He intended to live there at least for part of each year.

In January 1951, a dramatised version of Darkness at Noon by Sidney Kingsley opened in New York. It won the New York Drama Critics Award. Koestler donated all his royalties from the play to a fund he had set up to help struggling authors, the Fund for Intellectual Freedom (FIF). In June a bill was introduced in the United States Senate to grant Koestler permanent residence in the U.S. Koestler sent tickets for the play to his House sponsor Richard Nixon and his Senate sponsor Owen Brewster, a close confidant of Joseph McCarthy. The bill became law on 23 August 1951 as Private Law 221 Chapter 343 "AN ACT For the relief of Arthur Koestler".

In 1951, the last of Koestler's political works, The Age of Longing, was published. In it, he examined the political landscape of post-war Europe and the problems facing the continent. In August 1952, his marriage to Mamaine collapsed. They separated but remained close until her sudden and unexpected death in June 1954. The book Living with Koestler: Mamaine Koestler's Letters 1945–51, edited by Mamaine's twin sister Celia Goodman, gives insight into their lives together. Koestler decided to make his permanent home in Britain. In May 1953, he bought a three-story Georgian townhouse on Montpelier Square in London and sold his houses in France and the United States.

The first two volumes of his autobiography, Arrow in the Blue, which covers his life up to December 1931 when he joined the German Communist Party, and The Invisible Writing, which covers the years 1932 to 1940, were published in 1952 and 1954, respectively. A collection of essays, The Trail of the Dinosaur and Other Essays on the perils he saw facing Western civilization, was published in 1955. On 13 April 1955, Janine Graetz, with whom Koestler had an on-off relationship over a period of years, gave birth to his daughter Cristina. Despite repeated attempts by Janine to persuade Koestler to show some interest in her, Koestler had almost no contact with Cristina throughout his life. Early in 1956, he arranged for Cynthia Jeffries to have an abortion when she became pregnant; it was then illegal. Koestler's main political activity during 1955 was his campaign for the abolition of capital punishment (which in the UK was by hanging). In July, he started work on Reflections on Hanging.

==== Later life, 1956–1975 ====
Although Koestler resumed work on a biography of Kepler in 1955, it was not published until 1959. In the interim, it was entitled The Sleepwalkers. The book's emphasis had changed and broadened to "A History of Man's Changing Vision of the Universe", which also became the book's subtitle. Copernicus and Galileo were added to Kepler as the major subjects of the book. Later in 1956, as a consequence of the Hungarian Uprising, Koestler became busy organising anti-Soviet meetings and protests. In June 1957, Koestler gave a lecture at a symposium in Alpbach, Austria, and fell in love with the village. He bought land there, built a house, and used it for the next twelve years as a place for summer vacations and organising symposia. In May 1958, he had a hernia operation. In December, he left for India and Japan and was away until early 1959. He wrote the book The Lotus and the Robot on his travels.

In early 1960, on his way back from a conference in San Francisco, Koestler interrupted his journey at the University of Michigan in Ann Arbor, Michigan, where some experimental research was going on with hallucinogens. He tried psilocybin and had a "bad trip". Later, when he arrived at Harvard to see Timothy Leary, he experimented with more drugs but was not enthusiastic about that experience either. In November 1960, he was elected to a Fellowship of The Royal Society of Literature.

In 1962, along with his agent, A. D. Peters, and the editor of The Observer, David Astor, Koestler set up a scheme to encourage prison inmates to engage in arts activities and to reward their efforts. Twenty years later he left £10,000 in his will to the Koestler Trust. Nowadays Koestler Arts supports over 7,000 entrants from UK prisons annually and awards prizes in fifty art forms. In late Autumn each year, Koestler Arts runs an exhibition usually at London's Southbank Centre.

Koestler's book The Act of Creation was published in May 1964. In November, he undertook a lecture tour at various universities in California. In 1965, he married Cynthia in New York, and they moved to California, where he participated in a series of seminars at the Center for Advanced Study in the Behavioral Sciences at Stanford University. Koestler spent most of 1966 and early 1967 working on The Ghost in the Machine. In his article "Return Trip to Nirvana", published in 1967 in the Sunday Telegraph, Koestler wrote about the drug culture and his own experiences with hallucinogens. The article also challenged the conclusion about mescaline experience in Aldous Huxley's The Doors of Perception.

In April 1968, Koestler was awarded the Sonning Prize "for [his] outstanding contribution to European culture". The Ghost in the Machine was published in August of the same year, and in the autumn, he received an honorary doctorate from Queen's University, Kingston, Canada. In the later part of November, the Koestlers flew to Australia for a number of television appearances and press interviews. The first half of the 1970s saw the publication of four more books by Koestler: The Case of the Midwife Toad (1971), The Roots of Coincidence and The Call-Girls (both 1972), and The Heel of Achilles: Essays 1968–1973 (1974). In the 1972 New Year Honours, he was appointed a Commander of the Order of the British Empire (CBE).

==== Final years, 1976–1983 ====
Early in 1976, Koestler was diagnosed with Parkinson's disease. The trembling of his hand made writing progressively more difficult. He cut back on overseas trips and spent the summer months at a farmhouse in Denston, Suffolk, which he had bought in 1971. That same year saw the publication of The Thirteenth Tribe, which presents his Khazar hypothesis of Ashkenazi ancestry. In 1978, Koestler published Janus: A Summing Up. In 1980 he was diagnosed with chronic lymphocytic leukaemia. His book Bricks to Babel was published that year. His final book, Kaleidoscope, containing essays from Drinkers of Infinity and The Heel of Achilles: Essays 1968–1973, with some later pieces and stories, was published in 1981. During the final years of his life, Koestler, Brian Inglis, and Tony Bloomfield established the KIB Society (named from the initials of their surnames) to sponsor research "outside the scientific orthodoxies." After his death, it was renamed the Koestler Foundation. In his capacity as vice-president of the Voluntary Euthanasia Society, later renamed Exit, Koestler wrote a pamphlet on suicide, outlining the case both for and against, with a section dealing specifically with how best to do it.

Koestler and Cynthia killed themselves on the evening of 1 March 1983 at their London home, 8 Montpelier Square, with overdoses of the barbiturate Tuinal taken with alcohol. Their bodies were discovered on the morning of 3 March, by which time they had been dead for 36 hours. Koestler had stated more than once that he was afraid, not of being dead, but of the process of dying. His suicide was not unexpected among his close friends. Shortly before his suicide, his doctor had discovered a swelling in the groin, which indicated a metastasis of the cancer. Koestler's suicide note read:

To whom it may concern.

The purpose of this note is to make it unmistakably clear that I intend to commit suicide by taking an overdose of drugs without the knowledge or aid of any other person. The drugs have been legally obtained and hoarded over a considerable period.

Trying to commit suicide is a gamble the outcome of which will be known to the gambler only if the attempt fails, but not if it succeeds. Should this attempt fail and I survive it in a physically or mentally impaired state, in which I can no longer control what is done to me, or communicate my wishes, I hereby request that I be allowed to die in my own home and not be resuscitated or kept alive by artificial means. I further request that my wife, or a physician, or any friend present, should invoke habeas corpus against any attempt to remove me forcibly from my house to hospital.

My reasons for deciding to put an end to my life are simple and compelling: Parkinson's disease and the slow-killing variety of leukaemia (CCI). I kept the latter a secret even from intimate friends to save them distress. After a more or less steady physical decline over the last years, the process has now reached an acute state with added complications which make it advisable to seek self-deliverance now, before I become incapable of making the necessary arrangements.

I wish my friends to know that I am leaving their company in a peaceful frame of mind, with some timid hopes for a de-personalised after-life beyond due confines of space, time and matter and beyond the limits of our comprehension. This "oceanic feeling" has often sustained me at difficult moments, and does so now, while I am writing this.

What makes it nevertheless hard to take this final step is the reflection of the pain it is bound to inflict on my surviving friends, above all my wife Cynthia. It is to her that I owe the relative peace and happiness that I enjoyed in the last period of my life – and never before.

The note was dated June 1982. Below it appeared the following:

Since the above was written in June 1982, my wife decided that after thirty-four years of working together she could not face life after my death.

Further down the page appeared Cynthia's own farewell note:

I fear both death and the act of dying that lies ahead of us. I should have liked to finish my account of working for Arthur – a story which began when our paths happened to cross in 1949. However, I cannot live without Arthur, despite certain inner resources.

Double suicide has never appealed to me, but now Arthur's incurable diseases have reached a stage where there is nothing else to do.

The funeral was held at the Mortlake Crematorium in South London on 11 March 1983. Controversy arose over why Koestler allowed, consented to, or (according to some critics) compelled his wife's simultaneous suicide. She was only 55 years old and believed to be healthy. In a typewritten addition to her husband's suicide note, Cynthia wrote that she could not live without her husband. Reportedly, few of the Koestlers' friends were surprised by this admission, apparently perceiving that Cynthia lived her life through her husband and that she had no "life of her own". Her absolute devotion to Koestler can be seen clearly in her partially completed memoirs. Despite this, according to a profile of Koestler by Peter Kurth:

All their friends were troubled by what Julian Barnes calls "the unmentionable, half-spoken question" of Koestler's responsibility for Cynthia's actions. "Did he bully her into it?" asks Barnes. And "if he didn't bully her into it, why didn't he bully her out of it?" Because, with hindsight, the evidence that Cynthia's life had been ebbing with her husband's was all too apparent.

With the exception of some minor bequests, Koestler left the residue of his estate, about £1 million (worth about £3.59 million in 2021), to the promotion of research into the paranormal through the founding of a chair in parapsychology at a university in Britain. The estate's trustees had great difficulty finding a university to establish such a chair. Oxford, Cambridge, King's College London and University College London were approached, and all refused. Eventually, the trustees reached an agreement with the University of Edinburgh to set up a chair, the Koestler Parapsychology Unit, in accordance with Koestler's request.

=== Personal life and allegations ===
Koestler's relations with women have been a source of controversy. David Cesarani alleged in his biography of Koestler, published in 1998, that Koestler had been a serial rapist, citing the case of the British feminist writer Jill Craigie who said that she had been his victim in 1951. Feminist protesters forced the removal of his bust from Edinburgh University. In his biography, Koestler: The Indispensable Intellectual (2009), Michael Scammell countered that Craigie was the only woman to go on record that she had been raped by Koestler, and had done so at a dinner party more than fifty years after the event. Claims that Koestler had been violent were added by Craigie later, although Scammell concedes that Koestler could be rough and sexually aggressive.

Some critics believed that Cesarani's claims of Koestler having been a serial rapist were unfounded; in his review of Cesarani's biography in The New York Times, the historian Mark Mazower observed: "Even those who applaud Cesarani for bringing the rape issue forward may wonder whether his approach is not too one-sided to make for a convincing portrait. Koestler was a domineering man. But he attracted women and many remained close friends with him after they had slept with him. It is implausible to write them all off as masochists, as Cesarani effectively does. Some broke with him; but then so did many other friends and acquaintances." Similarly, John Banville, in the London Review of Books, wrote:

Koestler himself, and at least one Hungarian friend, saw nothing odd in [Koestler's] bed-hopping. 'In Central Europe,' George Mikes wrote in defence of Koestler, 'every woman was regarded as fair game. She could always say "no" and ... her no would be taken for an answer, even if grudgingly.' Cesarani will have none of this political incorrectness, and stoutly declares: 'There is evidence that as well as his consistent violence against women Koestler was a serial rapist.' The evidence that Cesarani adduces in support of this accusation is an account of a particular encounter between Koestler and Jill Craigie, the wife of Michael Foot.

Cesarani and others claim that Koestler had misogynistic tendencies. He engaged in numerous sexual affairs and generally treated the women in his life badly. In his autobiography, The Invisible Writing, Koestler admits to having denounced Nadezhda Smirnova, with whom he was having a relationship, to the Soviet secret police.

== Influence and legacy ==
It is difficult to think of a single important twentieth-century intellectual who did not cross paths with Arthur Koestler, or a single important twentieth-century intellectual movement that Koestler did not either join or oppose. From progressive education and Freudian psychoanalysis through Zionism, communism, and existentialism to psychedelic drugs, parapsychology, and euthanasia, Koestler was fascinated by every philosophical fad, serious and unserious, political and apolitical, of his era.

— Anne Applebaum, The New York Review Of Books

Koestler wrote several major novels, two volumes of autobiographical works, two volumes of reportage, a major work on the history of science, several volumes of essays, and a considerable body of other writing and articles on subjects as varied as genetics, euthanasia, Eastern mysticism, neurology, chess, evolution, psychology, the paranormal and more.

Darkness at Noon was one of the most influential anti-Soviet books ever written. Its influence in Europe on Communists and sympathisers and, indirectly, on the outcomes of elections in Europe, was substantial. Geoffrey Wheatcroft believes that Koestler's most important books were the five completed before he was 40: his first memoirs and the trilogy of anti-totalitarian novels that included Darkness at Noon.

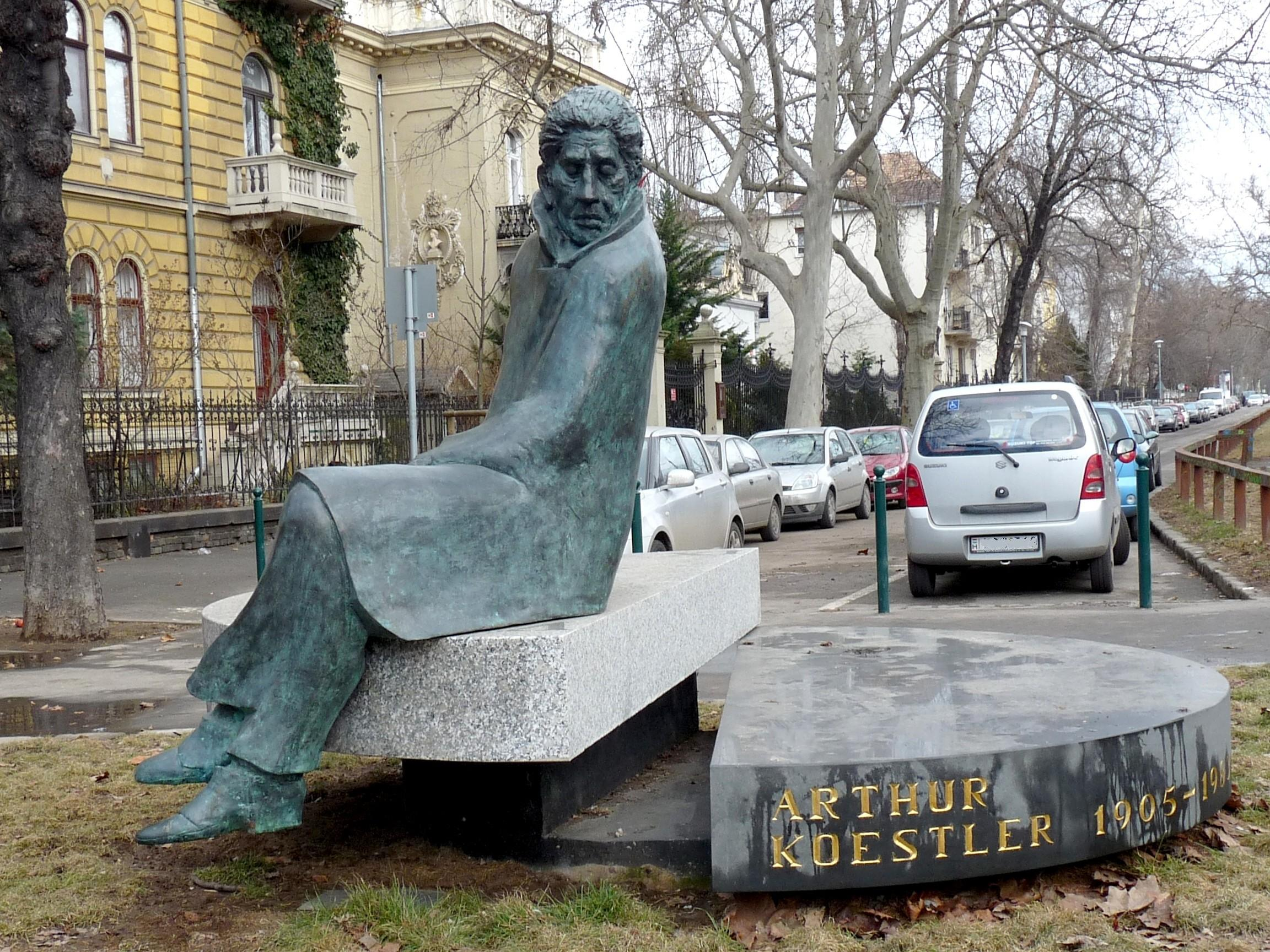
Arthur Koestler statue in Budapest

=== Politics and causes ===
Koestler embraced a multitude of political, as well as non-political issues. Zionism, communism, anti-communism, voluntary euthanasia, abolition of capital punishment, particularly hanging, and the abolition of quarantine for dogs being reimported into the United Kingdom are examples.

=== Science ===
In his book The Case of the Midwife Toad (1971) Koestler defended the biologist Paul Kammerer, who claimed to have found experimental support for Lamarckian inheritance. According to Koestler, Kammerer's experiments on the midwife toad may have been tampered with by a Nazi sympathiser at the University of Vienna. Koestler came to the conclusion that a kind of modified "Mini-Lamarckism" may explain some rare evolutionary phenomena.

Koestler criticised neo-Darwinism in a number of his books but was not opposed to the theory of evolution in general terms. Biology professor Harry Gershenowitz described Koestler as a "populariser" of science despite his views not being accepted by the "orthodox academic community". According to an article in the Skeptical Inquirer, Koestler was an "advocate of Lamarckian evolution – and a critic of Darwinian natural selection as well as a believer in psychic phenomena".

In addition to his specific critiques of neo-Darwinism, Koestler was opposed to what he saw as dangerous scientific reductionism more generally, including the behaviourism school of psychology, promoted in particular by B. F. Skinner during the 1930s. Koestler assembled a group of high-profile antireductionist scientists, including C. H. Waddington, W. H. Thorpe, and Ludwig von Bertalanffy, for a meeting at his retreat in Alpbach in 1968. This was one of many attempts which Koestler made to gain acceptance within the mainstream of science, a strategy which brought him into conflict with individuals such as Peter Medawar who saw themselves as defending the integrity of science from outsiders. Although he never gained significant credibility as a scientist, Koestler published a number of works at the border between science and philosophy, such as Insight and Outlook, The Act of Creation, and The Ghost in the Machine. Koestler viewed the physical universe as a branched hierarchy, which included social organisations, living organisms, molecules, atoms, and sub-atomic particles. He observed that the systems at intermediate levels have a dual nature, for they are unitary wholes with respect to the levels below, and component parts with respect to the levels above, and he called these systems holons. Koestler itemised the properties of holons in open hierarchical systems.

=== Paranormal ===
Mysticism and a fascination with the paranormal imbued much of Koestler's later work and he discussed paranormal phenomena, such as extrasensory perception, psychokinesis, and telepathy. In his book The Roots of Coincidence (1972) he claims that such phenomena can never be explained by theoretical physics. According to Koestler, distinct types of coincidence could be classified, such as "the library angel", in which information (typically in libraries) becomes accessible through serendipity, chance or coincidence, rather than through the use of a catalogue search. The book mentions yet another line of unconventional research by Paul Kammerer, the theory of coincidence or seriality. He also presents critically the related concepts of Carl Jung. More controversial were Koestler's studies and experiments on levitation and telepathy.

=== Judaism ===
Koestler was Jewish by birth but did not practise the religion. In an interview published in the British newspaper The Jewish Chronicle in 1950, he argued that Jews should either emigrate to Israel or assimilate completely into the majority cultures they lived in. In The Thirteenth Tribe (1976), Koestler advanced a theory that Ashkenazi Jews are descended not from the Israelites of antiquity but from the Khazars, a Turkic people in the Caucasus that converted to Judaism in the 8th century and was later forced westwards. Koestler argued that a proof that Ashkenazi Jews have no biological connection to biblical Jews would remove the racial basis of European anti-Semitism. In reference to the Balfour Declaration, Koestler stated that "one nation solemnly promised to a second nation the country of a third".

== Collaboration with the Information Research Department ==
Much of Arthur Koestler's work was funded and distributed secretly by a covert propaganda wing of the UK Foreign Office, known as the Information Research Department (IRD). Koestler enjoyed strong personal relationships with IRD agents from 1949 onwards, and was supportive of the department's anti-communist goals. Koestler's relationship with the British government was so strong that he had become a de facto advisor to British propagandists, urging them to create a popular series of anti-communist left-wing literature to rival the success of the Left Book Club.

== Languages ==
Koestler first learned Hungarian, but later his family spoke mostly German at home. From his early years he became fluent in both languages. It is likely that he picked up some Yiddish too, through contact with his grandfather. By his teens, he was fluent in Hungarian, German, French and English. During his years in Israel, Koestler became sufficiently fluent in Hebrew to write stories in that language, as well as to create what is believed to have been the world's first Hebrew crossword puzzle. During his years in the Soviet Union (1932–1933), although he arrived with a vocabulary of only 1,000 words of Russian, and no grammar, he picked up enough colloquial Russian to speak the language. Koestler wrote his books in German up to 1940 but then wrote only in English; L'Espagne ensanglantée was translated into French from German. Koestler is said to have coined the word mimophant, which he later used to describe Bobby Fischer.

== Quotes ==
In August 1945, Koestler was in Palestine where he read in the Palestine Post about the dropping of the atomic bomb on Hiroshima. He said to a friend: "That's the end of the world war, and it is also the beginning of the end of the world."

== Published works ==
=== Fiction (novels) ===
- 1934 (2013). Die Erlebnisse des Genossen Piepvogel in der Emigration
- 1939. The Gladiators (about the revolt of Spartacus)
- 1940. Darkness at Noon
- 1943. Arrival and Departure
- 1946. Thieves in the Night
- 1951. The Age of Longing, ISBN 978-0-09-104520-3.
- 1972. The Call-Girls: A Tragicomedy with a Prologue and Epilogue. A novel about scholars making a living on the international seminar-conference circuit. ISBN 978-0-09-112550-9

=== Drama ===
- 1945. Twilight Bar.

=== Autobiographical writings ===
- 1937. Spanish Testament.
- 1941. Scum of the Earth.
- 1942. Dialogue with Death.
- 1952. Arrow in the Blue: The First Volume of an Autobiography, 1905–31, 2005 reprint, ISBN 978-0-09-949067-8
- 1954. The Invisible Writing: The Second Volume of an Autobiography, 1932–40, 1984 reprint, ISBN 978-0-8128-6218-8
- 1984. Stranger on the Square co-written with Cynthia Koestler, published posthumously, edited and with an Introduction and Epilogue by Harold Harris, London: Hutchinson, 1984, ISBN 978-0-09-154330-3.

NB The books The Lotus and the Robot, The God that Failed, and Von weissen Nächten und roten Tagen, as well as his numerous essays, all may contain further autobiographical information.

=== Other non-fiction ===
- 1934. Von weissen Nächten und roten Tagen. About Koestler's travels in the USSR. In his The Invisible Writing, Koestler calls the book Red Days and White Nights, or, more usually, Red Days. Of the five foreign language editions − Russian, German, Ukrainian, Georgian, Armenian − planned, only the German version was eventually published in Kharkov, Ukrainian S.S.R. The edition is very rare.
- 1937. L'Espagne ensanglantée.
- 1942 (summer) Le yogi et le commissaire.
- 1945. The Yogi and the Commissar and Other Essays.
- 1948. "What the Modern World is Doing to the Soul of Man". Essay in The Challenge of Our Time. 1948.
- 1949. Promise and Fulfilment: Palestine 1917–1949.
- 1949. Insight and Outlook. 1949.
- 1952. The Trail of the Dinosaur. Google Books
- 1955. The Trail of the Dinosaur and Other Essays.
- 1955. The Anatomy of Snobbery in The Anchor review No.1
- 1956. Reflections on Hanging.
- 1959. The Sleepwalkers: A History of Man's Changing Vision of the Universe. ISBN 978-0-14-019246-9 An account of changing scientific paradigms.
- 1960. The Watershed: A Biography of Johannes Kepler. (excerpted from The Sleepwalkers.) ISBN 978-0-385-09576-1
- 1960. The Lotus and the Robot, ISBN 978-0-09-059891-5. Koestler's journey to India and Japan, and his assessment of East and West.
- 1961. Control of the Mind.
- 1961. Hanged by the Neck. Reuses some material from Reflections on Hanging.
- 1963. Suicide of a Nation.
- 1964. The Act of Creation.
- 1967. The Ghost in the Machine. Penguin reprint 1990: ISBN 978-0-14-019192-9.
- 1968. Drinkers of Infinity: Essays 1955–1967.
- 1971. The Case of the Midwife Toad, ISBN 978-0-394-71823-1. An account of Paul Kammerer's research on Lamarckian evolution and what he called "serial coincidences".
- 1972. The Roots of Coincidence, ISBN 978-0-394-71934-4. Sequel to The Case of the Midwife Toad.
- 1973. The Lion and the Ostrich.
- 1974. The Heel of Achilles: Essays 1968–1973, ISBN 978-0-09-119400-0.
- 1976. The Thirteenth Tribe: The Khazar Empire and Its Heritage, ISBN 978-0-394-40284-0.
- 1976. Astride the Two Cultures: Arthur Koestler at 70, ISBN 978-0-394-40063-1.
- 1977. Twentieth Century Views: A Collection of Critical Essays, ISBN 978-0-13-049213-5.
- 1978. Janus: A Summing Up, ISBN 978-0-394-50052-2. Sequel to The Ghost in the Machine
- 1980. Bricks to Babel. Random House, ISBN 978-0-394-51897-8. This 1980 anthology of passages from many of his books, described as "A selection from 50 years of his writings, chosen and with new commentary by the author", is a comprehensive introduction to Koestler's writing and thought.
- 1981. Kaleidoscope. Essays from Drinkers of Infinity and The Heel of Achilles, plus later pieces and stories.

=== Writings as a contributor ===
- The Encyclopœdia of Sexual Knowledge (1934) (In his autobiography The Invisible Writing, Koestler uses the ligature œ in the spelling of the word "Encyclopaedia".)
- Foreign Correspondent (1940) uncredited contributor to Alfred Hitchcock film produced by Walter Wanger
- The God That Failed (1950) (collection of testimonies by ex-Communists)
- Attila, the Poet (1954) (Encounter; 1954.2 (5)). On loan at the UCL library of the School of Slavonic & Eastern European Studies.
- University College London
- Beyond Reductionism: The Alpbach Symposium. New Perspectives in the Life Sciences (co-editor with J. R. Smythies, 1969), ISBN 978-0-8070-1535-3
- The Challenge of Chance: A Mass Experiment in Telepathy and Its Unexpected Outcome (1973)
- The Concept of Creativity in Science and Art (1976)
- Life After Death, (co-editor, 1976)
- Humour and Wit. I: Encyclopædia Britannica. 15th ed. vol. 9.(1983)
- humour, Encyclopædia Britannica

== See also ==
- Herbert A. Simon – American academic and Nobel Laureate (1916–2001)
- Holism – Philosophical theory
- Holon (philosophy) – Something that is simultaneously a whole and a part
- Information Research Department
- Janus – Roman god
- Politics in fiction – Literary genre
