= Tom Watson (actor) =

Scottish actor (1932–2001)

- Born: 21 March 1932; Auchinleck, Ayrshire, Scotland
- Died: 18 August 2001 (aged 69); St Andrews, Fife, Scotland
- Occupation: Actor

Thomas Welsh Watson (21 March 1932 - 18 August 2001) was a Scottish-born stage, television and film actor.

== Early life ==
Watson was born on 21 March 1932 at Auchinleck, Ayrshire, Scotland. His family later moved to Cambuslang, Lanarkshire, and he studied at the Hamilton Academy, where he excelled in amateur dramatics.

== Career ==
Following National Service with the Royal Scots, Watson joined the Rutherglen Repertory, a semi-professional theatre company. In 1956 he joined the Byre Theatre in St Andrews, Scotland, before moving on to Perth Repertory Theatre. There he met his future wife, the actress Joyce Bain.

=== Television ===
By 1960 Watson had moved to London and was appearing regularly in BBC radio repertory. In 1964 he was cast in the BBC television production of Martin Chuzzlewit.

During his long career Watson appeared in numerous television series, including The Diary of Samuel Pepys, Dixon of Dock Green, Dr. Finlay's Casebook, Taggart, Prime Suspect, Hamish Macbeth, Heartbeat (British TV series), The Main Chance, Two Thousand Acres of Sky, Inspector Rebus and Peak Practice. In Your Cheatin' Heart by John Byrne (Scottish playwright) he played six different parts.

Following his return to Scotland in 1970 Watson worked regularly for the BBC and Granada Television, including appearances as Mobilis in Cedric Messina's production of The Physicist and the Miller in The Canterbury Tales for the BBC, for which he also appeared in such series and dramas as The Standard, Hunting Tower, The Camerons, The Nightmare Man, A Wholly Healthy Glasgow and Govan Ghost Story.

From 1994 to 1996 Watson played the consultant surgeon Mr Ernest Docherty in the BBC series Cardiac Arrest. He was portrayed as the voice of reason against a management intent on alienating the nursing and clinical staff.

=== Theatre ===
Year	Title	Role	Company	Director	Notes
1982	Ane Satyre of the Thrie Estaites	Dilegence	Scottish Theatre Company	Tom Fleming	play by Sir David Lindsay, adapted by Robert Kemp
1989	The Gorbals Story	William Mutrie	7:84	David Hayman	play by Robert McLeish
1990	The Ship	Hughie	The Ship's Company, Govan	Bill Bryden	play by Bill Bryden staged at Harland and Wolff, Govan

Watson's other stage appearances included The Catch at the Royal Court Theatre Upstairs in London, Tom Stoppard's Every Good Boy Deserves Favour and, as Stanley Evening, Bugler Boy for the Traverse Theatre in Edinburgh. At the Edinburgh Festival he appeared in 1970 in Middleton's The Changeling (play), directed by Richard Eyre, Sir David Lyndsay's Ane Satire of the Thrie Estates (1984), and A Wholly Healthy Glasgow, directed by Richard Wilson, in 1987. Watson’s theatre credits continued with appearances in Sam Shepard's Fool for Love (play) at the Royal National Theatre and in the West End of London, In Time of Strife at the Glasgow Citizens Theatre, Macbeth and Hamlet at the Lyceum Theatre, Edinburgh, Born Yesterday at the Royal Exchange, Manchester, The Treatment and Some Voices at the Royal Court Theatre, The Government Inspector at the Almeida Theatre, Islington, in 1997 and 1998, and Victoria for the Royal Shakespeare Company in 2000.

=== Films ===
Watson’s film work included Silent Scream, The Big Man (1990) and Alan Rickman's The Winter Guest.

=== Poems ===
Watson also produced a volume of poems, Dark Whistle, published in 1997.

== Death ==
Watson died on 18 August 2001 at St Andrew's Memorial Hospital in St Andrews, Fife.
