= Sadie Aitken =

Scottish manager, producer and theatre activist (1905–1985)

- Born: Sarah Ross Aitken; 15 July 1905; Dunbar, Scotland
- Died: 5 January 1985 (aged 79); Edinburgh, Scotland

Sadie Aitken (born Sarah Ross Aitken; 15 July 1905 – 5 January 1985) was a Scottish theatre manager, producer, actor and theatre activist prominent in Scottish theatre from 1935 until her death. Her contribution to theatre in Scotland spanned amateur, community, applied and professional drama. As a compliment, she was nicknamed "The Caledonian Lilian Baylis".

== Early years ==
Born to mother Lily Birss and father William Aitken in Dunbar, Scotland, Aitken attended Stockbridge and Broughton schools. She was first introduced to theatre at a fundraising pageant at Craigmillar Castle.

== Career ==
Her first job was working in a lawyer's office, and she joined the Church of Scotland social services in 1927.

In 1928 Aitken became the first Edinburgh District secretary of the Scottish Community Drama Association (SCDA), filling this role until the 1970s. Even as she continued in that capacity, she took on amateur and professional acting roles .

A proponent of community arts activity, Aitken worked with young boys in the 1930s in drama at the Little Theatre in the Pleasance (at the time it was a slum where her father worked as a church official), and she founded the SCDA's St. Andrews Summer school in 1942. She continued her work there throughout the rest of her life.

The Gateway Theatre in Edinburgh came under her management in 1946, where she became the first women in Scotland to have a theatre license. The Gateway Theatre Company was officially founded in 1953 and presented films and productions featuring amateurs and professionals. It was also a community youth club and multimedia centre.

In 1948, she was able to persuade Robert Kemp and Tyrone Guthrie of the theatre potential of the Kirk's Assembly Hall for the Edinburgh International Festival production of Sir David Lyndsay's Ane Satyre of the Thrie Estaitis, and with her encouragement, the Kirk Drama Federation flourished from 1950 until the 1980s when activities moved to the Netherbow Arts Centre.

After the Gateway Company closed in 1965, Aitken continued to perform for television and film, working with SCDA, and started working as a critic for the BBC.

In 1973, Aitken played the role of Jury Foreman in film The Night for Country Dancing.

She died 5 January 1985 in Edinburgh, Scotland.

== Awards ==
- Queen's Silver Jubilee Medalist
