= Nell Ballantyne =

Scottish actress (1898–1959)

- Born: 1 December 1898; Glasgow, Scotland
- Died: 21 February 1959 (aged 60); Glasgow, Scotland
- Occupation: Actress
- Years active: 1943–1959 (film and theatre)

Nell Ballantyne (1 December 1898 – 21 February 1959) was a Scottish stage, radio and film actress.

Ballantyne was born Nellie Lochhead Ballantyne on 1 December 1898 in Glasgow, Scotland. She was the daughter of Elizabeth Lochhead and dairyman, Peter Ballantyne. She married a manufacturer's agent, Robert McGregor Graham, in 1925, they had a daughter in 1929 and they later divorced.

After graduating from the Royal Academy of Dramatic Art in 1921, she became one of the first members of the Scottish National Players. Her best known role on stage was in the world premiere of The Glen is Mine by John Brandane on 25 January 1923. She was also well known for her parts in two radio soap operas; Front Line Family in 1941 and The McFlannels in 1947. The first film she appeared in was The Shipbuilders in 1943 alongside Morland Graham.

Ballantyne appeared in the Edinburgh Gateway Company's production of John Brandane's Rory Aforesaid in 1954. She became a permanent member of the company in the following year, and remained at The Gateway Theatre for four years.

She died in Glasgow on 21 February 1959.

== Theatre ==
Year	Title	Role	Company	Director	Notes
1948	Ane Satyre of the Thrie Estaites	Soutar's wife	The Glasgow Citizens Theatre	Tyrone Guthrie, Moultrie Kelsall	play by Sir David Lyndsay, adapted by Robert Kemp

== Selected filmography ==
- The Shipbuilders (1943)
- Mr. Emmanuel (1944)
- Fortune Lane (1947)
- Bonnie Prince Charlie (1948)
- Laxdale Hall (1953)
- Rockets Galore (1958)
- The Bridal Path (1959)
