= Gateway Theatre (Edinburgh) =

Former theatre and cinema in Edinburgh, Scotland, later converted to a housing block

Coordinates: 55°57′35″N 3°10′56″W

The Gateway Theatre was a Category C listed building in Edinburgh, Scotland, situated on Elm Row at the top of Leith Walk.

== History ==
=== Veterinary College ===
The building was purpose-built by George Beattie and Sons in 1882 to accommodate W. Owen Williams' New Veterinary College (not to be confused with the Royal (Dick) Veterinary College, which is still extant, elsewhere in the city). The college had a statuary group of animals (one horse, one cow and one dog) over the entrance, carved by John Rhind which survived until the mid 20th century.

In 1904, the College vacated the building, with a professor and eleven students relocating to the veterinary faculty at Liverpool. The college buildings were sold to William Perry in 1908, who then applied for a roof to be built over the courtyard to create a roller-skating rink.

=== Cinema ===
Perry's rink did not last long and the building was converted again in 1910, by architect Ralph Pringle, into a cinema known as Pringle's New Picture Palace. It was also for a period in 1929-30 known as The Atmospheric.

=== Repertory Theatre ===
When the cinema closed in the 1930s, the building was used as a theatre by an amateur dramatics group. During this time, it was known as Millicent Ward's Studio Theatre and the Festival Theatre, before being renamed the Broadway in 1938. Shortly after the war, the premises were gifted to the Church of Scotland. The Kirk appointed the Rev. George Candlish as director and formed its own repertory theatre company based in the venue. The building re-opened as a theatre in 1946, with seating for 542. Sadie Aitken was appointed Theatre Manager and remained in that post until 1965. She was responsible for changing the name of the theatre to The Gateway. It was a venue for the precursor of what would become the Edinburgh Festival Fringe, the world's largest arts festival, hosting the Pilgrim Players who performed two T.S. Eliot plays, The Family Reunion and Murder in the Cathedral. Robert Kemp's Let Wives Tak Tent, a translation into Scots of Molière's L'École des femmes, was first performed at the Gateway in 1948.

By 1953, the Church had handed the theatre over to an independent, professional theatre company, with Robert Kemp as Chairman of the Board. The Kirk retained control of the front-of-house, the box office and the café. The Edinburgh Gateway Company included many of Scotland's finest actors and actresses (Tom Fleming and Lennox Milne were co-founders) and its repertoire included many plays by contemporary Scottish dramatists. Between the years 1953 and 1965, this company produced 150 plays. Molly MacEwen, who had designed the costumes for Tyrone Guthrie's Edinburgh International Festival production of Ane Satyre of the Thrie Estaites and the sets and costumes for Kemp's Let Wives Tak Tent, both in 1948, was appointed as the company's designer.

In 1958, the playwright Robert McLellan claimed that the Gateway was the only theatre providing the dramatist writing authentically of Scottish life and character with actors accomplished in Scottish speech and a producer capable of guiding them.

==== 1953-54 season ====
For the 1953-54 season, the company included Tom Fleming, Lennox Milne, Marjorie Dalziel, Michael Elder, Sheila Donald, John Young, George P. Davies, Ian MacNaughton, Rona Anderson, Sheila Prentice, Margaret Hilder, Kathryn Orr, Martin Heller and Anthony Howat. James "Gibbie" Gibson was producer. The plays staged were The Forrigan Reel by James Bridie, An Inspector Calls by J.B. Priestley, What Every Woman Knows by J.M. Barrie, The Other Dear Charmer by Robert Kemp, an adaptation of A Christmas Carol by Roger Weldon, Bunty Pulls the Strings by Graham Moffat, Hame by Albert Mackie, The Herald's Not for Sale by A.B. Paterson, the double-bill Rory Aforesaid and The Glen is Mine by John Brandane, One Traveller Returns by Moray McLaren, and The Heart is Highland by Robert Kemp.

==== 1954-55 season ====
The company's Council resisted a bid by the Edinburgh International Festival's Director, Sir Ian Hunter, to take over the Gateway for the period of the Festival, choosing instead to mount its own productions during August. In August 1954, the company staged a repeat production of Kemp's The Other Dear Charmer, Meg Buchanan playing the maid in place of Marjorie Dalziel, and Marillyn Gray replacing Kathryn Orr in the role of Jenny Clow. The American theatre director Peter Potter joined the company as guest producer for the season, while James Gibson was working in London. The other plays staged in the 1954-55 season were The Dashing White Sargeant by Campbell Gairdner and Rosamunde Pilcher, Meeting at Night by James Bridie, The Flouers o' Edinburgh by Robert McLellan, The Burning Glass by Charles Morgan, The World My Parish and Family Circle by Robert J.B. Sellar, Rope by Patrick Hamilton, The Lass wi the Muckle Mou by Alexander Reid, Christmas in the Market Place by Henri Ghéon, and Marigold by Robert Kemp and Cedric Thorpe Davie, Sheena by Albert D. Mackie, Mr. Gillie by James Bridie, and The Laird o' Grippy by Robert Kemp, in which John Laurie played the leading role.

==== 1955-56 season ====
Mary Helen Donald, Norman Fraser, Brian Carey, Nell Ballantyne and Pamela Bain joined the company for the 1955-56 season. James Gibson rejoined the company as producer. Plays produced included The Conspirators and The Scientific Singers by Robert Kemp, Waiting for Gillian by Ronald Millar, Our Maggy by D. Heddle, Heather on Fire by Moray McLaren, Beneath the Wee Red Lums and Bachelors Are Bold by Tim Watson, The Boy David by J.M. Barrie, Susie Tangles the Strings by Graham Moffat, Come to the Fair by Robert J.B. Sellar, Ghosts and Old Gold by Reid Kennedy, and Juno and the Paycock by Seán O'Casey.

==== 1956-57 season ====
The Anatomist by James Bridie was the Festival production in August 1956. Christine Turnbull and Roddy McMillan joined the company during the 1956-57 season. Other productions included The Open by A.B. Paterson, Lucky Strike by Michael Brett, The Man Among the Roses by Robert Kemp, Tolka Row by Maura Laverty, Weir of Hermiston by Robert J.B. Sellar, Johnnie Jouk the Gibbet by Tim Watson, The Wax Doll by Alexander Reid, A Scrape o the Pen by Graham Moffat, and Muckle Ado by Moray McLaren. The company split in two after Muckle Ado, one part making a winter tour of the South of Scotland with A Nest of Singing Birds by Robert Kemp. The rest of the company remained at The Gateway, staging The Tinkers of the World by Ian R. Hamilton and MacHattie's Hotel by Albert D. Mackie. The full company came together again to end the season with The Admirable Crichton by J.M. Barrie and The Playboy of the Western World by J.M. Synge.

==== 1957-58 season ====
The Festival production in August 1957 was McLellan's The Flouers o' Edinburgh. Duncan Macrae played the Nabob and Walter Carr played the servant, Jack. Evelyn Elliot, Diana Tullis and André Coutin joined the company in 1957. Plays produced during the 1957-58 season included Dr. Angelus by James Bridie, Drama at Inish by Lennox Robinson, The Non-Resident by Moray MacLaren, The Penny Wedding and The Daft Days by Robert Kemp, Arise, Sir Hector by R.J.B. Sellar, When We Are Married by J.B. Priestley, The Wild Duck by Henrik Ibsen, and All in Good Faith by Roddy McMillan. The company split again in February 1958, the touring group taking Robert Kemp's The Other Dear Charmer to the Borders. The rest of the company staged All for Mary by Kay Bannerman and Harold Brooke, and Black Chiffon by Lesley Storm at The Gateway. The season ended with The Schoolmistress by Arthur Wing Pinero.

==== 1958-59 season ====
Robert J.B. Sellar's adaptation of Robert Louis Stevenson's novel Weir of Hermiston was the Festival production in August 1958. Other plays produced in the autumn of 1958 were Keep in a Cool Place by William Templeton, Look Back in Anger by John Osborne, and The Warld's Wonder by Alexander Reid. The company then took The Penny Wedding to the Citizens in Glasgow, Dundee Rep and Perth as part of a Scottish Repertory exchange. On their return to Edinburgh the company staged Boyd's Shop by St. John Greer Ervine and A Doll's House by Henrik Ibsen. The Christmas production in 1958 was Miracle at Midnight, a nativity play by Tom Fleming. The first play staged in the New Year was The Forrigan Reel. Later in 1959, the company had a short summer run, reviving The Heart is Highland, Muckle Ado, The Open and Keep in a Cool Place.

==== 1959-60 season ====
There was no Festival production at The Gateway in 1959, as company members were fully engaged in Guthrie's final production of Ane Satyre of the Thrie Estaites at the Kirk's Assembly Hall. Richard Mathews joined the company in 1959. Plays produced in the 1959-60 season included French Without Tears by Terence Rattigan, The Keys of Paradise by Ronald Mavor, Arsenic and Old Lace by Joseph Kesselring, The Master of Ballantrae, The Ghost Train by Arnold Ridley, The Late Christopher Bean by Emlyn Williams, a revival of Miracle of Midnight, and an adaption of Rob Roy by Robert Kemp.

==== 1960-61 season ====
Moultrie R. Kelsall became the company's Chairman in 1960. The plays produced during the 1960-61 season were Mary Stuart in Scotland by Bjørnstjerne Bjørnson, The Taming of the Shrew by William Shakespeare, Master John Knox by Robert Kemp, The Lesson and The New Tenant by Eugène Ionesco, The Rainmaker by N. Richard Nash, Frost at Midnight by André Obey, Listen to the Wind by Angela Ainley Jeans and Vivian Ellis. My Three Angels by Sam and Bella Spewack, The Skin of Our Teeth by Thornton Wilder, The Comic by Maurice Fleming, and The Country Boy by John Murphy.

==== 1961-62 season ====
The plays produced during the 1961-62 season were Let Wives Tak Tent by Robert Kemp, Papa is All by Patterson Greene, The Switchback by James Bridie, All My Sons by Arthur Miller, It Looks Like a Change by Donald MacLaren, The Man from Thermopylae by Ada F. Kay, Foursome Reel by Andrew Malcolm, That Old Serpent by John Prudhoe, Don't Tell Father by Harold Brooke and Kay Bannerman, Hot Summer Night by Ted Willis, The Sleepless One by Vincent Brome, and Pygmalion by George Bernard Shaw.

==== 1962-63 season ====
John Cairney joined the company in 1962, playing James Boswell in Robert McLellan's Young Auchinleck. The other plays produced during the 1962-63 season were The Good Soldier Schweik by Jaroslav Hašek, Juno and the Paycock by Sean O'Casey, The Rivals by Richard Brinsley Sheridan, The Birthday Party by Harold Pinter, The Perfect Gent by Robert Kemp, Twelfth Night and Othello by William Shakespeare, Noah by André Obey, The Little Minister by J.M. Barrie, An Italian Straw Hat by Eugene Lebech and Marc-Michel, Bus Stop by William Inge, The Glass Menagerie by Tennessee Williams, and Waiting for Godot by Samuel Beckett.

==== 1963-64 season ====
In 1963, Victor Carin was appointed as the company's Director of Productions. The plays produced during the 1963-64 season were All in Good Faith by Roddy MacMillan, The Hypochondriack by Victor Carin, Ring Round the Moon by Jean Anouilh, I'm Talking About Jerusalem by Arnold Wesker, Photo Finish by Peter Ustinov, Treasure Hunt by M.J. Farrell and John Perry, The Merry Wives of Windsor by William Shakespeare, Tobias and the Angel by James Bridie, Charley's Aunt by Brandon Thomas, Schweik in the Second World War by Bertolt Brecht, Someone Waiting by Emlyn Williams, and Arms and the Man by George Bernard Shaw.

==== 1964-65 season ====
The plays produced during the 1964-65 season were The Golden Legend of Shultz by James Bridie, The Heart is Highland by Robert Kemp, She Stoops to Conquer by Oliver Goldsmith, The Fire Raisers by Max Frisch, Marching Song by John Whiting, Present Laughter by Noël Coward, A Midsummer Night's Dream by William Shakespeare, The Plough and the Stars by Seán O'Casey, The Scythe and the Sunset by Denis Johnston, Becket by Jean Anouilh, The Happiest Days of Your Life by John Dighton, Our Town by Thornton Wilder, Heartbreak House by George Bernard Shaw, The Circle by Somerset Maugham, and Journey's End by R.C. Sheriff.

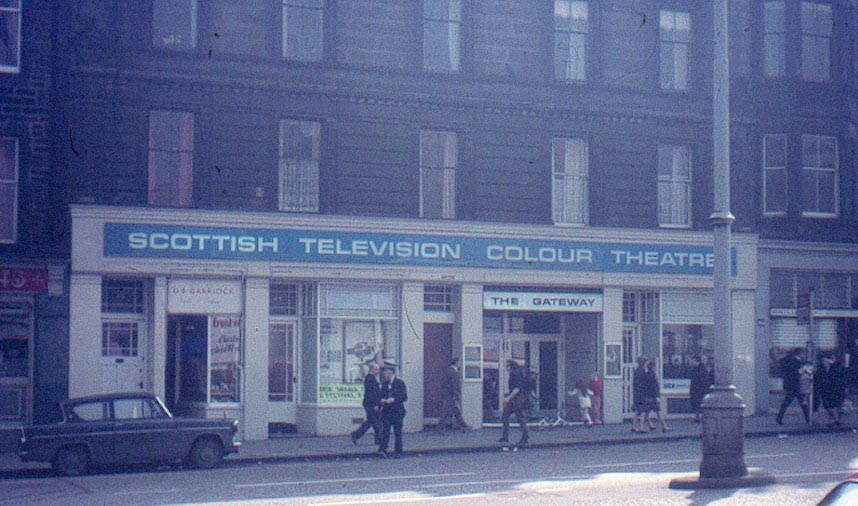
STV Gateway in 1974

==== End of the company ====
As Edinburgh Corporation was acquiring the Royal Lyceum Theatre to establish a civic theatre in 1965, the Gateway, then back in use as a cinema, closed once more. It was then purchased by Scottish Television in 1968. It was converted into the Scottish Colour Studio.

=== Queen Margaret University's School of Drama and Creative Industries ===
In its final public incarnation, it was one of three sites that comprised the Queen Margaret University (QMU) campus and was the last part of that university within the City of Edinburgh. It was bought by the university in 1988 and converted back into a theatre for the expansion of their Drama School conservatoire and the dramatic arts courses Queen Margaret offered. Alterations, by Law and Dunbar-Nasmith, were completed in 1994 at a cost of £5m. The theatre, and its purpose-built facilities (such as voice studios, movement studios, radio and tv studios, an acting studio etc), helped consolidate QMU's reputation as one of the UK's leading Drama Schools attracting students and staff from across the world. Moreover, the theatre began to get a reputation as a top venue for national and international productions during the Edinburgh Festival Fringe;consequently, being named as Scotland's International Drama Centre in 1999. Extensive refurbishment work took place in 1998, funded with £1.5 million of National Lottery money. Many leading actors and theatre practitioners were involved in supporting the Gateway and the Drama School such as Tom Fleming, Judi Dench, Fiona Shaw, Simon Callow, Antony Sher, Jimmy Logan, Augusto Boal among others. In 2004, Professor Maggie Kinloch, Director of both the Gateway Theatre and the University’s School of Drama and Creative Industries, launched Scotland’s Theatre Gateway which was an initiative with the Scottish Arts Council to promote Scottish talent during the Edinburgh Festival Fringe.

In 2005, the University was forced to close the theatre after a safety inspection declared it unsafe, with an estimated £3 million cost to make it so. This deprived the city of both a major Fringe venue and its principal drama school. In the immediate aftermath, it left three theatre companies - Scottish Dance Theatre, Theatre Cryptic and Vanishing Point - without a base for that year's Fringe.

Discussions were entered into as to whether to carry out the repairs to the main auditorium, or to relocate to the university's Craighall campus, which was opening in 2007. The possibility of using the Brunton Theatre in Musselburgh was also discussed. Part of the Drama School transferred to the university's Corstorphine campus, while the Gateway continued to host QMU drama students in the Pend studio space until 2008.

In 2006 the University obtained planning permission for demolition of the building to create residential accommodation. The building finally underwent conversion to accommodation in 2012.

The site is now a student housing block, valued at £8m.

== Bibliography ==
- Mackie, A.D., Kemp, Robert, Milne, Lennox, Fleming, Tom & Kelsall, Moultrie R. (1965), The Twelve Seasons of the Edinburgh Gateway Company, 1953 - 1965, St. Giles Press, Edinburgh
- Brown, Ian, ed. (2004). Journey's Beginning: The Gateway Theatre Building and Company, 1884-1965. Bristol: Intellect Books. ISBN 1-84150-108-5.
- Elder, Michael (2003), What do You do During the Day?, Eldon Productions, ISBN 9780954556808
- Fisher, Mark (2012). The Edinburgh Fringe Survival Guide: How To Make Your Show A Success. London: Methuen. ISBN 978 1 408 13252 4.
