= Scottish Theatre Company =

The Scottish Theatre Company was started in 1980 under the direction of Dundee-born actor Ewan Hooper who had revived the Greenwich Theatre, London in 1969, but for most of its 8 years it was directed by his successor Tom Fleming. From its production base in Glasgow, where its home theatre was the Theatre Royal, it set out its policy of presenting Scottish and international classic drama, and commissioned new plays of Scottish drama. It was launched with a performance of Let Wives Tak Tent, Robert Kemp's translation into Scots of Molière's L'Ecole des Femmes, at the McRobert Centre at the University of Stirling on 16 March 1981. It toured nationally and appeared at the Edinburgh International Festival. The company represented British Theatre at the International Theatre Biennale in Warsaw in 1986 with Sir David Lyndsay's Ane Satyre of the Thrie Estaites.

Despite attracting large audiences and its success in securing commercial sponsorship, including Scottish Television, it was brought to an end when the Scottish Arts Council stopped its annual funding. Papers relating to the administration and productions of the Scottish Theatre Company, including papers relating to administration, productions, finance, sponsorship and publicity, 1980-1987 are deposited in Glasgow University Library Special Collections Scottish Theatre Archive.

== 1981 season ==
- Let Wives Tak Tent by Robert Kemp
- Civilians by Bill Bryden
- Animal by Tom McGrath
- Ghosts by Henrik Ibsen

== 1982 season ==
- Jamie the Saxt by Robert McLellan
- Ane Satyre of the Thrie Estaites by Sir David Lyndsay

== 1984 season ==
- Commedia by Marcella Evaristi
- Mr. Gillie by James Bridie

== 1985 season ==
- The Wallace by Sydney Goodsir Smith
- Ane Satyre of the Thrie Estaites by Sir David Lyndsay
- Life of Galileo by Bertolt Brecht

== 1986 season ==
- Ane Satyre of the Thrie Estaites by Sir David Lyndsay (Edinburgh and Warsaw)
- What Every Woman Knows by J.M. Barrie
- A Drunk Man Looks at the Thistle by Hugh MacDiarmid (Glasgow)
