= Robert Gillespie =

British actor, director and writer (born 1933)

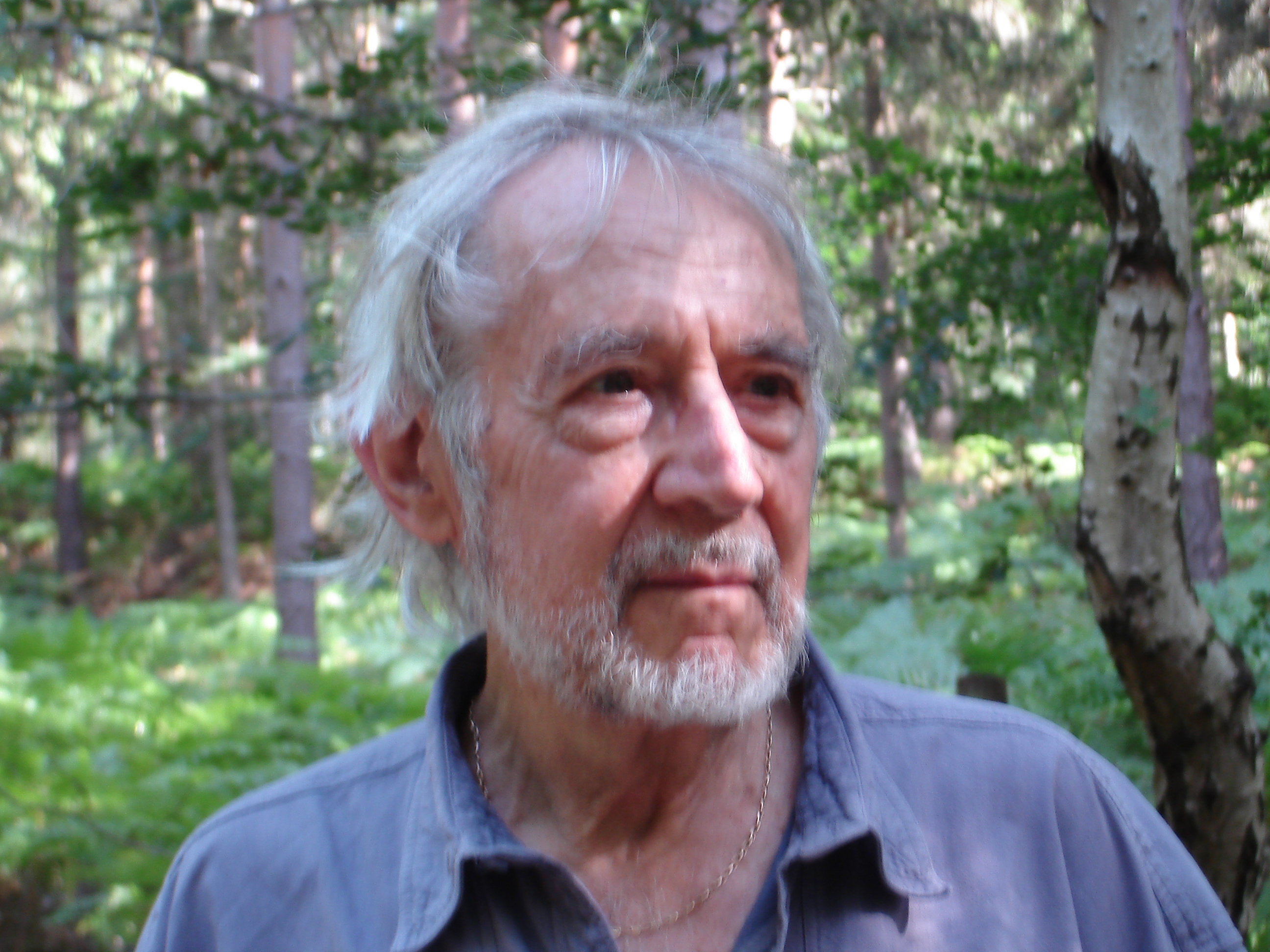
- Gillespie in 2006
- Born: 9 November 1933 (age 92); Lille, France
- Television: Keep It in the Family; George and Mildred; Leave it to Charlie; Agony; The Professionals; Midnight Is a Place; Robin's Nest; Return of the Saint; Whatever Happened to the Likely Lads

Robert James Gillespie (born 9 November 1933) is a British actor, director and writer. Notable acting credits include Keep It in the Family (1980), At the Earth's Core (1976) and Force 10 from Navarone (1978). Later, he appeared in Jimmy McGovern's Broken and Mike Leigh's film Peterloo about the Peterloo Massacre. The first volume of his autobiography, Are You Going To Do That Little Jump?, was published in 2017. A second volume, Are You Going To Do That Little Jump? The Adventure Continues followed in October 2021. At the same time, Gillespie launched a new publicly-available and growing online archive of his extensive career, entitled Little Jump.

== Early life ==
Gillespie is the eldest child of Magdalena Katalin Singer, from Budapest, Hungary; and James William Gillespie, who was of Scottish descent, from Toronto, Canada. He was born in Lille, but the family left France in 1940 after Hitler's invasion of the country.

== Education ==
Gillespie was educated at Sale Grammar School, and trained as an actor at RADA between 1951 and 1953.

== Career ==
=== Career overview ===
Robert Gillespie entered the theatrical profession at a time when every playscript had to be approved by the Lord Chamberlain's Office, or risk prosecution. The only platform for plays addressing controversial subjects like homosexuality, or contentious political topics, existed at club theatres like the New Lindsey, in Notting Hill, with a private membership. Gillespie witnessed the day Brendan Behan used the F-word on BBC Television (1956) which rocked the corporation. But times changed. 70 years later Gillespie relished playing a repellent, paedophile priest opposite Sean Bean in an episode of Broken by Jimmy McGovern – at which no-one turned a hair. Robert Gillespie is especially interested in this period of enormous transition and has written about it.

=== Contributions to British theatre ===
From drama school, Gillespie joined the Old Vic Company in 1953 and found an unexpected mix of acting styles used on the stage in each production. Richard Burton and Claire Bloom headed the company, and Gillespie expected them firmly to deploy a modern style of acting. Strangely, Burton's sonorous baritone delivery echoed the last chimes of a declamatory style, while Bloom wavered between a naturalistic delivery (borrowed from her recent film with Charlie Chaplin) and a 'singing' tone. It was Michael Hordern (playing Polonius, Malvolio and Parolles) who chatted in a delightful, modern manner. Inevitably, during his two-year stay with the company (1953–55), the quality of production was uneven. The second year was headed by Paul Rogers, Ann Todd, Virginia McKenna and John Neville. Gillespie's most substantial part was Adam in As You Like It. The highlight of both years was Douglas Seale's production of Henry IV Parts 1 and 2.

It is with gratitude that Gillespie views his hiring by George Devine at the very start of Devine's creation of The English Stage Company at the Royal Court Theatre (1956–58). It is George Devine, in Gillespie's view, who should be credited with launching modern theatre in the UK. Devine dared to present the transforming play Look Back in Anger by John Osborne and brought Berthold Brecht into mainstream drama.

In sharp contrast, Gillespie found Joan Littlewood's claim to ground-breaking innovation to be dubious and unfounded. He joined her Theatre Workshop company, based at the Theatre Royal, Stratford, for three productions in 1956 and left by mutual agreement while rehearsing a fourth. Littlewood's chief claim was that she could imbue the great classics with a fresh, accessible approach. The results were uniformly disappointing, a view supported by an almost uniformly bad press. (History suggests that her break-through to personal success rode on the new "kitchen-sink" style of play, viz. A Taste of Honey, and its musical equivalent.) Gillespie has written about his time at Theatre Workshop.

In 1970, he appeared in Keep Out, Love in Progress by Walter Hall, at the Basement Theatre, Soho, taking the lead opposite Alex Marshall. He performed in David Lan's Paradise at the Royal Court Theatre, John Arden's The Hero Rises Up at the Roundhouse, Peter Hall's Playhouse Theatre production of Tennessee Williams' The Rose Tattoo (starring Julie Walters).

He appeared on stage as Charlie in Mincemeat, with Cardboard Citizens, a company based on homeless actors founded by Adrian Jackson MBE. He also played Luka in The Lower Depths.

He recalls his two and a half years with the Royal Shakespeare Company as "actor paradise" (1994–6) writing of the advance in general standard of performance, quality of backstage support and the respect and care shown to the individual artist – in contrast to the hierarchical regime in place at The Old Vic, forty years before, when deference to one's "superiors" was still expected. At the RSC, Tony Britton was fine as Sir Toby Belch in Ian Judge's production of Twelfth Night and Desmond Barrit an excellent Malvolio – showing great professional curiosity as to how Michael Hordern had addressed the part.

=== Television ===
His first major television role was as the disciple Matthew in Jesus of Nazareth, directed by Joy Harington.

Gillespie appeared in many British sitcoms, including Hugh and I Spy, The Good Life, Whatever Happened to the Likely Lads, Robin's Nest, George and Mildred (2 episodes, one as Detective Sergeant Burke and one as Mr Richardson (a vet)), Rising Damp, The Fall and Rise of Reginald Perrin, Porridge, Dad's Army (in which he played Charles Boyer playing Napoleon Bonaparte), Butterflies, The Liver Birds, Beggar My Neighbour, Only When I Laugh (series one, “Let Them Eat Cake”), Agony, Terry and June and It Ain't Half Hot Mum. He often played deadpan police desk sergeants.

Gillespie was the star of the Brian Cooke situation comedy Keep It in the Family, playing the harassed cartoonist Dudley Rush, a part that Cooke wrote especially for him. The show ran for five series transmitted between 1980 and 1983. It also starred Pauline Yates, Stacy Dorning, Jenny Quayle and Sabina Franklyn.

Gillespie appeared in many British television series, mostly from the 1960s to 1980s. His credits include Maigret, The Saint, The Avengers, Doomwatch, The Sweeney, The New Avengers, Survivors, Warship, The Professionals, Mary's Wife, I Woke Up One Morning, Return of the Saint, Bonjour La Classe and Secret Army. He has appeared in New Tricks, with James Bolam, as well as Jimmy McGovern's Broken, alongside Sean Bean.

=== TV Advertising ===
Robert made at least one TV Advert for Birds Eye, produced by Collett Dickenson Pearce Advertising Agency, in the 1970s. This saw him in the role of a petrol pump attendant who had to serve a large number of motorcycle riders. All boisterous but at the end of the advert, over his dinner, he says, "But they were a nice bunch of lads".

=== Film ===
Film appearances include the Pride segment of The Magnificent Seven Deadly Sins (1971), The National Health (1973), Barry McKenzie Holds His Own (1974), Force Ten From Navarone (1978), The Thirty Nine Steps (1978), and the 1996 Royal Shakespeare Company production of A Midsummer Night's Dream. He appeared in Woody Harrelson's ambitious live-action movie Lost in London, playing the part of the mystic cabbie and later took part in the Mike Leigh project Peterloo.

=== Writings ===
Gillespie has published two linked books charting the enormous changes undergone within the performing arts over three-quarters of a century, written from the point of view of a practising tradesman - Are You Going to do That Little Jump (pub. 2017) and Are You Going to do That Little Jump - The Adventure Continues (pub. 2021). The title comes from a moment in Terence Rattigan's Harlequinade, describing the unforgivable misdemeanour of upstaging. The author suggests that theatre practice changed to such an extent over this period that young performers of today will hardly recognise the profession they enter now as the same as the one he entered in 1947. The two volumes, which provide a personal reminiscence of living theatre history, are supported by unique photographs, illustrations, and letters unavailable in other archives.

Gillespie wrote a celebrated sketch for Ned Sherrin's BBC TV show That Was the Week That Was in 1963. Commonly entitled "A Consumer's Guide to Religion", it was performed by David Frost and proved to be a satirical landmark. It provoked questions in the House of Commons and fulminations from pulpits.

=== Theatre directing and writing ===
Gillespie has directed many plays for the stage, including seventeen productions at the King's Head Theatre in Islington between the 1970s and mid-1980s, starting with The Love Songs of Martha Canary which starred Heather Sears. Tom Conti, Jack Shepherd, John Hurt, Tony Doyle, Nichola McAuliffe and Steve Harley starred in Gillespie's shows there. Notable productions were Spokesong, Tennessee Williams' Period of Adjustment, which Williams attended personally, and Punch critic Jeremy Kingston's Oedipus at the Crossroads, which starred Nicky Henson, Raymond Westwell and John Bott.

=== Jane Nightwork Productions ===
Gillespie created his own production company, Jane Nightwork Productions, in 2000. Productions have included David Mamet's Oleanna, Jeremy Kingston's Making Dickie Happy, Deborah Cook's Sex, Death and a Baked Swan and Eugene Scribe's Golden Opportunities, translated by former Times Arts Editor Anthony Curtis, which received its UK premiere at the Warehouse Theatre in Croydon in September 2006. In May 2008 he directed a reading of Chains by Eugene Scribe at the Trafalgar Studios.

Gillespie toured a two-handed drama (largely comic) in London and the Home Counties on the topic of death (My Heart, 2000). On 6 April 2010, Gillespie's production of his own play Love, Question Mark opened at the New Diorama Theatre for a 4-week run. The play addresses our curious fixation with monogamy. Love, Question Mark is the first part of a trilogy entitled, Power of Three: Love, War and Death. The play starred Clare Cameron and Stuart Sessions and was produced by Lucy Jackson.

== Filmography ==
Year	Title	Role	Notes
1963	Siege of the Saxons	Soldier	Uncredited
1968	Inspector Clouseau	Senior Swiss Banker	Uncredited
1969	Otley	Policeman	
1969	Frankenstein Must Be Destroyed	Mortuary Attendant	Uncredited
1971	A Severed Head	Winking Patient	
1971	To Catch a Spy	Man in Elevator	
1971	The Magnificent Seven Deadly Sins	A.A. Man	Segment "Pride"
1972	Rentadick	Arab Porter	
1972	Up the Front	French Officer	
1973	The National Health	Tyler	
1974	Barry McKenzie Holds His Own	Dorothy	
1975	Rising Damp	Gas Man	Episode 'The Last Of The Big Spenders'
1976	At the Earth's Core	Photographer	
1978	Force Ten From Navarone	Sergeant	
1978	The Thirty Nine Steps	Crombie	
1979	The Prisoner of Zenda	Andrews	Uncredited
1994	Zorn	Assistant	
1996	A Midsummer Night's Dream	Robin Starveling / Cobweb	
2017	Lost in London	Older Cabbie	
2018	Peterloo	Magistrate Warmley	
