= Cedric Thorpe Davie =

Musician and composer (1913–1983)

Cedric Thorpe Davie OBE (30 May 1913 – 18 January 1983) was a musician and composer, most notably of film scores such as The Green Man in 1956. A high proportion of his film and documentary music and his concert pieces have a Scottish theme.

== Life ==
Cedric Thorpe Davie was born in Lewisham in south London, the son of Thorpe Davie, a music teacher and choir master, and his cousins included the artist and musician Alan Davie and the conductor Muir Mathieson. The family moved to Glasgow early in his life and he attended the High School of Glasgow.

He studied at the Scottish National Academy of Music in Glasgow and the Royal Academy of Music in London. At the Academy he studied piano with Egon Petri and Harold Craxton, horn with Aubrey Brain and harmony with Eric Thiman, before moving to the Royal College of Music for composition lessons with Ralph Vaughan Williams and R. O. Morris. At the College he established firm friendships with Gerald Finzi and Howard Ferguson. In 1935 he travelled to both Helsinki (where he visited Sibelius) and Budapest for further training under Yrjo Kilpinen and Zoltán Kodály, returning to Glasgow in 1936 where he began lecturing in music. Early works include the Piano Trio in C minor (1932), the Phantasie Quartet (1935), the one act opera Gammer Gurton's Needle (1936) and the Concerto for Piano and Strings (1944).

In the Second World War he served in the National Fire Service covering the Glasgow docklands (an area of intense bombing). His Symphony in C major “In Honour of My Brother” was entered for the Daily Express symphony competition of 1945, coming second to the Symphony of Liberation by Bernard Stevens. It was first performed at the Royal Albert Hall on 7 July 1946, conducted by Constant Lambert. After the war Davie moved to St Andrews University as Master of Music, being raised to full Professor of Music in 1973.

He was involved in the newly created Edinburgh Festival in the 1950s, and oversaw the music for a production of Ane Satyre of the Thrie Estaites, the beginning of a lasting collaboration with Robert Kemp and Tyrone Guthrie. He was fond of putting Scottish literary works to music, including: Sunset Song, Cloud Howe, The Beggar's Benison, A Drunk Man Looks at the Thistle, and Ramsay's The Gentle Shepherd. The Diversions on a theme of Thomas Arne was played at the Last Night of the Proms in 1955. He also wrote the music for the Edinburgh Gateway Company's production of Robert Kemp's musical Marigold in 1955.

In 1955 he was made an Officer of the Order of the British Empire (OBE). In 1978, he was elected a Fellow of the Royal Society of Edinburgh. His proposers were Sir Thomas Malcolm Knox, J. Steven Watson, Sir Norman Graham, Norman Gash, GWS Barrow and Anthony Elliot Ritchie.

Davie also wrote a book on musical form: Musical Structure and Design (1953). A substantial collection of his manuscripts and scores is held by the University of St Andrews. The University held a special event to mark the centenary of Davie's birth in 2013.

Recordings of his work have been few until a recent revival of interest. Royal Mile, his Coronation March of 1952, was recorded by John Wilson with the Royal Ballet Sinfonia in 2000. In 2026 Toccata Classics issued the first of a planned series of music by Cedric Thorpe Davie, including his Fantasia No.1 on Four Scottish Tunes (1937), the Symphony in C major (1946), the Diversions on a Theme by Dr Arne (1953/1954), the Festal Overture (1950) and Solemn Music from King Lear (1950).

== Personal life ==
In 1937, he married Margaret Russell Brown. She died on 1 October 1974. They had two sons: Anthony John Thorpe Davie (17 November 1939 – 8 January 2003); and Stephen William Thorpe Davie (born 8 April 1945). In 1978 he retired to live in a cottage in St John's Town of Dalry, Kirkcudbrightshire, and died there on 18 January 1983.

== Film scores by Davie ==
- Scotland Speaks (1940) documentary
- This Modern Age (1946)
- The Brothers (1947)
- Snowbound (1948)
- The Future of Scotland (1948) documentary
- The Bad Lord Byron (1949)
- The Adventurers (1951)
- You're Only Young Twice (1952)
- Highland Laddie (1952) documentary
- Rob Roy, the Highland Rogue (1953) a Disney film usually now simply called Rob Roy
- The Miner's Widow (1954) documentary
- The Dark Avenger (1955)
- Jacqueline (1956)
- The Land of Robert Burns (1956) documentary
- The Green Man (1956)
- The Kid from Canada (1957)
- The Enchanted Island (1957)
- Wales (1957) documentary
- Scotland (1957) documentary
- Rockets Galore! (1958)
- The Bridal Path (1959)
- A Terrible Beauty (1960)
- Kidnapped (1960)
- Disneyland (1963)

== Concert works ==
- Elegy for orchestra (1932)
- Piano Trio (1932)
- Concert Overture (1934)
- Sonatina for cello and piano (1934)
- Dirge for Cuthullin for chorus and orchestra (1935)
- Fantasy String Quartet (1935)
- Gammer Gurton’s Needle, op.1, opera (1936)
- Fantasia No.1 on Four Scottish Tunes for orchestra (1937)
- Three Anthems, chorus and organ (1937)
- Violin Sonata (1939)
- Sonatina for flute and piano (1939, rev. 1980)
- Concerto for piano and strings (1943)
- Symphony in C (1945)
- The Beggar’s Benison for orchestra (1947)
- Six Poems by Violet Jacob for tenor and piano (1948)
- Variations on a Theme of A.C. Mackenzie for orchestra (1949)
- Festal Overture (1950)
- Ode for St Andrew’s Night for tenor, chorus and orchestra (1950)
- Solemn Music from King Lear (1950)
- Royal Mile, Coronation March (1952)
- Diversions on a Tune by Dr Arne for orchestra (1953–4)
- Directions for a Map, cantata for soloists and string quartet (1955–6)
- Fantasia No.2 on Four Scottish Tunes for orchestra (1964)
- New Town, suite for orchestra (1966–7)

== Publications ==
- Music Structure and Design (1953, reprinted by Dover)
- The Oxford Scottish Song Book (1969) joint editor
- Scotland's Music (1980)
