= Tom Fleming (actor) =

Scottish actor, director, poet and television and radio commentator (1927–2010)

Thomas Kelman Fleming, CVO OBE FRSAMD (29 June 1927 – 18 April 2010) was a Scottish actor, director, and poet, and a television and radio commentator for the BBC.

== Early life ==
Fleming was born in Edinburgh and attended Daniel Stewart's College, where the performing arts centre was renamed in his honour shortly after his death. In 1945, he had his first speaking role in the theatre while on a tour of India with Edith Evans, playing Bruce McRae in Emlyn Williams's The Late Christopher Bean. He then served for two years in the Royal Navy.

== Career ==
=== Acting career ===
The first professional performance of Fleming's acting career came in 1947, in Robert Kemp's Let Wives Tak Tent. Along with Kemp and Lennox Milne, he co-founded the Gateway Theatre in Edinburgh in 1953.

Fleming first met the poet and cultural polemicist Hugh MacDiarmid in the late 1940s and was one of the readers for a shortened version of MacDiarmid's poem A Drunk Man Looks at the Thistle (1926) broadcast by the BBC in 1954. Fleming went on to give a reading of the full poem as an Edinburgh International Festival production in 1976. His performance was later broadcast by the BBC in its Saturday Night Theatre series and repeated on Radio 3. He performed the poem again as a Scottish Theatre Company production on 23 May 1986 at the Tron Theatre, Glasgow.

In 1956, Fleming played Jesus in the BBC's serial Jesus of Nazareth, the first time he had been portrayed on screen in Britain.

In August 1958, he played Lord Weir in the Gateway's Edinburgh International Festival production of R.J.B. Sellar's adaptation of Robert Louis Stevenson's novel, Weir of Hermiston. In October 1961, he played John Knox in the Gateway's production of Robert Kemp's Master John Knox. In 1962, he joined the Royal Shakespeare Company. That year he played the title role in William Gaskill's production of Cymbeline. In 1965, he founded a company at the Royal Lyceum Theatre in Edinburgh. His film roles included a supporting part as the Catholic priest John Ballard in the period drama Mary, Queen of Scots (1971). On television, he played the title role in the 1956 BBC children's series Jesus of Nazareth. In 1983, he played the part of Lord Reith, the BBC's first Director General, in a two-part BBC production written by Roger Milner, entitled simply Reith. In 1985, he played the title role in the Scottish Theatre Company's production of Bertolt Brecht's Life of Galileo. He played the title role in John Purser's play Carver, first broadcast by BBC Radio 3 on 31 March 1991.

=== Directing career ===
The Edinburgh Civic Theatre Trust appointed Fleming as the Lyceum Theatre's artistic director in 1965, and he staged a season of four plays between October and December. He resigned in 1966 in protest at the board's establishment of a subcommittee to control programming.

Fleming was the director of The Scottish Theatre Company for most of its years in the 1980s. He directed the company in the Edinburgh Festival production of Sir David Lyndsay's Ane Satyre of the Thrie Estaites, staged at the Assembly Hall in 1986.

=== Presenting career ===
He was a commentator for the BBC telecast of the Edinburgh Military Tattoo from 1966 until 2008. He was the BBC commentator for the Eurovision Song Contest 1972 in Edinburgh. He was a commentator on BBC television coverage of state events, and provided commentary outside Westminster Abbey for the Coronation of Elizabeth II in 1953 and also for the annual National Service of Remembrance at the Cenotaph between 1966 and 1988. For BBC Radio he provided commentary for The Cenotaph Service in 1991, 1992 and 1993 and the outside broadcast of the Commemoration of the 50th anniversary of The Battle of Britain as well as royal weddings and funerals, for example the ceremonial funerals of Princess Diana and Queen Elizabeth The Queen Mother. He also read the script of the famous soliloquy of Richard Dimbleby at the Lying-in-State of King George VI at a Service in Westminster Abbey to mark the placement of a plaque in memory of Richard Dimbleby in Poets’ Corner in 1990. This was at the special request of David and Jonathan Dimbleby. The service was broadcast live on BBC Radio Four. (Prod. David France).

=== Plays ===
- Miracle at Midnight, a nativity play staged by the Edinburgh Gateway Company in December 1958

== Honours and awards ==
He was appointed an Officer of the Order of the British Empire in 1980 and a Commander of the Royal Victorian Order in 1998.

Fleming also received an Honorary Doctorate from Heriot-Watt University in 1984.

== Personal life and death ==
Fleming, who never married, was organist, lay preacher, secretary and reader at the Canonmills Baptist church in Edinburgh. After a long illness, he died in St Columba's Hospice in Edinburgh on the night of Sunday 18 April 2010, aged 82.

== Television ==
Year	Title	Role	Director	Production	Notes
1953	The Other Dear Charmer	Robert Burns	James Crampsey	BBC Scotland	play by Robert Kemp
1956	Jesus of Nazareth	Jesus		BBC TV	8 part serial
1959	The Other Dear Charmer	Robert Burns	Pharic Maclaren	BBC Scotland	play by Robert Kemp
1959	Spindrift	Alec MacMillan (Airgiod)	Finlay J. Macdonald	BBC Scotland	play by Naomi Mitchison and Denis Macintosh, adapted for television by Ada F. Kay
1961	Rob Roy	Robert Roy MacGregor Campbell		BBC TV	7 part serial
1983	Reith	John Reith	Kenneth Ives	BBC TV	two-part production written by Roger Milner

Preceded by Dave Lee Travis	Eurovision Song Contest UK Commentator; 1972	Succeeded by Terry Wogan
