= The Dark Avenger =

1955 British film by Henry Levin

- 1955 British theatrical poster
- Directed by: Henry Levin
- Written by: Daniel B. Ullman; Phil Park (uncredited)
- Based on: story by Daniel B. Ullman
- Produced by: Walter Mirisch
- Starring: Errol Flynn; Joanne Dru; Peter Finch; Yvonne Furneaux
- Cinematography: Guy Green
- Edited by: Edward B. Jarvis
- Music by: Cedric Thorpe Davie
- Color process: Technicolor
- Production company: Allied Artists Pictures
- Distributed by: Allied Artists Pictures
- Release dates: April 15, 1955 (London); September 11, 1955 (USA)
- Running time: 85 minutes
- Country: United Kingdom
- Language: English
- Budget: $1 million
- Box office: 890,587 admissions (France)

"The Warriors" U.S. theatrical release poster

The Dark Avenger is a 1955 British historical action adventure film in CinemaScope directed by Henry Levin. The screenplay was written by Daniel B. Ullman (and an uncredited Phil Park). The film stars Errol Flynn, Joanne Dru and Peter Finch. The music score is by Cedric Thorpe Davie. It is also known as The Warriors in the United States, and had a working title of The Black Prince in the United Kingdom.

The Dark Avenger follows the adventures of Edward the Black Prince, son of King Edward III and heir to the throne of England, as he tries to liberate the people of Aquitaine from the cruel grasp of France during the Hundred Years' War.

The film was the last historical action film Errol Flynn made.

== Plot ==
Edward, Prince of Wales, son and heir to his father King Edward III of England, leads an English army to the French province of Aquitaine to protect its inhabitants from the ravages of the occupying French nobles and their army. After defeating their army in battle, the French nobles are forced to sign a surrender. They continue in secret, however, to plot to kill Prince Edward, refusing to honor the surrender. They kidnap as hostages the English Lady Joan Holland and her children in defiance of English rule over France. Prince Edward's hand is forced, so he decides to rescue her and the children. In the process, he barely survives an ambush and must adopt a French disguise as he hides among the peasantry. To get closer to his enemies, he adopts a final disguise as the nameless Black Knight. He learns of a coming attack by the French nobility and escapes with Lady Holland and her children to safety. From his Aquitaine castle, he leads his English knights and men-at-arms in a final climactic battle against the superior-in-number French forces that storm the castle, ultimately defeating the French nobles and their army.

== Cast ==
- Errol Flynn as Edward the Black Prince
- Joanne Dru as Lady Joan Holland
- Peter Finch as Comte de Ville
- Yvonne Furneaux as Marie
- Patrick Holt as Sir Ellys
- Michael Hordern as Edward III
- Moultrie Kelsall as Sir Bruce
- Robert Urquhart as Sir Philip
- Noel Willman as Du Guesclin
- Frances Rowe as Genevieve
- Alastair Hunter as Libeau
- Rupert Davies as Sir John
- Ewen Solon as D'Estell
- Vincent Winter as John Holland
- Richard O'Sullivan as Thomas Holland
- Jack Lambert as Dubois
- John Welsh as Gurd
- Harold Kasket as Arnaud
- Leslie Linder as François Le Clerc
- Robert Brown as First French Knight
- John Phillips as Second French Knight
- Christopher Lee (uncredited) as French Patrol Captain at tavern
- Marne Maitland (uncredited) as French Peasant
- Gerald (Ian) Lucas (uncredited) as Duke of Brittany

== Production ==
The film was originally known as The Black Prince.

It was the prestige production for Allied Artists in 1953–54, a co-production with Associated British Pictures, to be filmed in England, shot in CinemaScope and Technicolor. It was personally produced by Walter Mirisch, who was production head of Allied Artists at the time. Mirisch had developed the project with Dan Ullman. It was Allied's first production budgeted at $1 million.

The use of CinemaScope saw 20th Century Fox became involved as partners in production and distribution on the film, as part of an arrangement between it and Allied Artists. (It was a two-picture arrangement, the other film being The Adventures of Haji Baba). Allied Artists took Western distribution rights, Fox took Eastern. This enabled the studios to share costs, and for Allied to take advantage of Fox's superior distribution system in foreign markets when it came to handling CinemaScope films. It also enabled them to afford Errol Flynn in the lead role.

Joanne Dru was also imported to play the female lead; Peter Finch was cast as the main villain. Henry Levin was chosen to direct on the basis of several swashbuckling films he had made for 20th Century Fox and Columbia. The film was reported to be the biggest undertaking in Allied Artists history. Filming started on 2 August 1954. Shooting mainly took place at Elstree Studios (and used a castle constructed by MGM for Ivanhoe). Flynn made the feature shortly after his proposed film about William Tell had not come to fruition and was in bad need of funds. Walter Mirisch wrote in his memoirs that Flynn shaved off his moustache in preproduction to make him look younger; Mirish did not agree and arranged for the script to include Flynn growing back his moustache. The producer said that Flynn's drinking frequently held up the production, with the actor occasionally drinking during takes and being unable to remember his lines.

"He also did not look well in the picture", wrote Mirisch. "His face was puffy and he was clearly too old for the role, but I hoped careful photography might offset that. It didn't. Before we started to shoot, I asked him to diet and hopefully lose some weight, which he didn't do. There were only traces left of the face, physique and charm that he had brought to The Adventures of Robin Hood, Captain Blood, The Sea Hawk and all those other great adventure films of his youth".

== Reception ==
According to The New York Times, the film is "corn...every step of the way. But this Allied Artists presentation ... holds three assets that render it at least palatable. Number one, photographed (by Guy Green) in color at England's Elstree Studios, with a spanking array of period castles and costumes cluttering the lovely countryside, it all looks quite fetching. Number two, it moves. Finally—perhaps as a consequence—the familiar, history-laden plot unwinds with a surprising lack of pretentiousness for this type of film. Peeled of its vintage trappings, however, the picture would play—indeed, does—like the mouldiest kind of Western, the one about the noble cowboy who routs the greedy land barons (French), saving the land for the settlers and papa (His Majesty, King Edward I)".

The Los Angeles Times called it "an inferior but colorful swashbuckler".

Filmink said "Errol is too old and portly to play a dashing prince; also, he shaved off his moustache, which makes him look even older" and called the film "pretty bland stuff".

== See also ==
- List of British films of 1955
