= Weir of Hermiston =

1896 unfinished novel by Robert Louis Stevenson

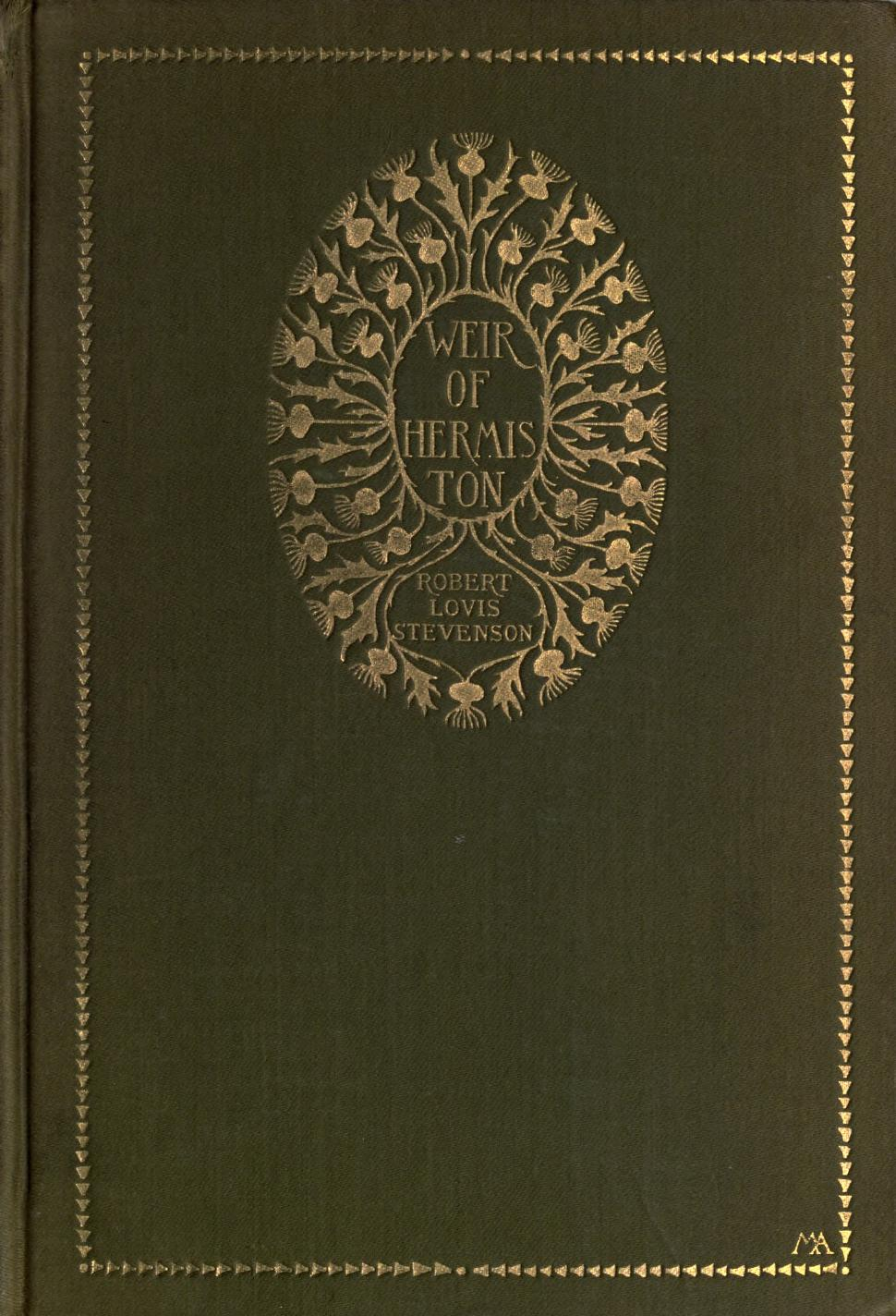
- First edition
- Author: Robert Louis Stevenson
- Language: English
- Genre: Novel
- Publisher: Chatto & Windus
- Publication date: 1896
- Publication place: London, England, United Kingdom
- Media type: Print (Hardback & Paperback)
- Pages: 290
- OCLC: 356636
- Text: Weir of Hermiston at Wikisource

Weir of Hermiston is an 1896 unfinished novel by Robert Louis Stevenson. It is markedly different from his previous works in style and has often been praised as a potential masterpiece. It was cut short by Stevenson's sudden death in 1894 from a cerebral haemorrhage. The novel is set at the time of the Napoleonic Wars.

== Synopsis ==
The novel tells the story of Archibald "Archie" Weir, a young man born into an upper-class Edinburgh family. Because of his Romantic sensibilities and sensitivity, Archie is estranged from his father, who is depicted as the coarse and cruel judge of a criminal court. By mutual consent, Archie is banished from his family of origin and sent to live as the local laird on a family property in the vicinity of the Borders hamlet Hermiston.

While serving as the laird, Archie meets and falls in love with Kirstie (Christina). As the two are deepening their relationship, the book breaks off. Confusingly, there are two characters in the novel called Christina, the younger of whom is Archie's sweetheart.

== Sequel ==
According to Sir Sidney Colvin, quoting Stevenson's stepdaughter, Stevenson intended the story to continue with the seduction of (young) Kirstie by Archie's dissolute friend Frank Innes. Kirstie's four brothers believe that Archie is the culprit and vow revenge on him. However, Archie has meanwhile confronted Frank and killed him, and is arrested for murder. He is tried for his life before his father (this is legally implausible, as Weir Snr. should have recused himself from presiding) and condemned to death. But the older Kirstie discovers the truth and tells the brothers, who break the jail and release Archie. Archie and his beloved Kirstie flee to America, presumably to live happily ever after.

This summary has much in common with the plot of Bulwer-Lytton's novel Paul Clifford (1830).

== Dramatisations ==
An adaptation of the novel by R. J. B. Sellar was staged at The Gateway Theatre in Edinburgh in 1956 and 1958, with Tom Fleming in the role of Lord Weir. Hermiston, an opera by Robin Orr, was staged during the Edinburgh International Festival in 1975.

== BBC adaptations ==
- The BBC made a 4-part television series of the story in 1973, starring Tom Fleming and Edith MacArthur.
- A radio play in 1992, dramatised by Robert Forrest and starring Forbes Masson.
- A 2-part BBC Radio 4 adaptation in 2020 starring Jack Lowden and Phyllis Logan.

== Cultural allusions ==
- The 1969 Jack Bruce song Weird of Hermiston gets its name from the book, although the lyrics make no reference to the story.
- The death sentence pronouncement of the proposed story is used at the end of the King Crimson instrumental, Lark's Tongues In Aspic, Part One in 1973.
- In the movie version of Fahrenheit 451, one of the characters has memorized the book, and is teaching it to his nephew before he dies.
- The Robert Louis Stevenson website maintains a complete list of derivative works.
- The city of Hermiston, Oregon, takes its name from the book.
- The FX television show Archer makes humorous reference to the book in Season 9, Episode 5: "Danger Island: Strange Doings in the Taboo Groves."
