= Jill Day (singer) =

British singer (1930–1990)

Yvonne Page, known professionally as Jill Day (12 December 1930 – 15 November 1990) was an English pop singer and actress in Britain in the 1950s and early 1960s. She was nicknamed "the Blonde Belter".

== Career ==
Day was born in Brighton, Sussex, England, and found fame in film, radio and television. By 1954, as the former lead singer for Geraldo's Orchestra, she had topped the bill at the London Palladium, and co-starred in the West End production of The Talk of the Town. A Jill Day comic strip drawn by Denis Gifford was published in Star Comics (1954), edited by Gifford and Bob Monkhouse. Day also appeared in the 1955 comedy film All for Mary. In addition, she sang on the soundtrack of The Good Companions and Doctor at Sea. In 1957, she competed in the heats of the contest to represent the United Kingdom in the 1957 Eurovision Song Contest, eventually losing out to Patricia Bredin. Day was known for her long slim dresses with stiff petticoat under the below-the-knee hem, which she wore in numerous television appearances.

In the early 1960s, Day had her own comedy sketch show on BBC Television, The Jill Day Show. She also appeared on Dee Time.

She faded from public view as public taste for pop music changed through the late 1950s and 1960s, eventually retiring from show business and residing in London. She later owned racehorses and had a number of business ventures, including a theatrical agency and a baby clothes company.

Day died from cancer in November 1990 in Kingston-Upon-Thames, Greater London, England, at the age of 59.

== Discography ==
In March 2003, a compilation album of her best-known songs was released, The Very Best of Jill Day:. The tracks were:

1. "Sincerely"
2. "Happiness Street"
3. "I'm Old Fashioned"
4. "A Holiday Affair"
5. "A Quiet Man"
6. "Mangos"
7. "A Tear Fell"
8. "Little Johnny Rainbow"
9. "I Dreamed"
10. "Cinco Robles"
11. "Give Her My Love When You Meet Her"
12. "I'll Think About You"
13. "I Hear You Knocking"
14. "Hold Me in Your Arms"
15. "Wherever You May Be"
16. "Far Away From Everybody"
17. "The Snowy Snowy Mountain"
18. "Somewhere In The Great Beyond"
19. "Oh Daddy Can I Be Your Dolly Forever"
20. "I've Got My Love to Keep Me Warm"
21. "Ding Dong"
22. "Lonely Nightingale"
23. "Promises"
24. "The Way of Love"
25. "Chee Chee Oo Chee"
26. "Whistlin' Willie"
