= A Drunk Man Looks at the Thistle =

Long poem by Hugh MacDiarmid

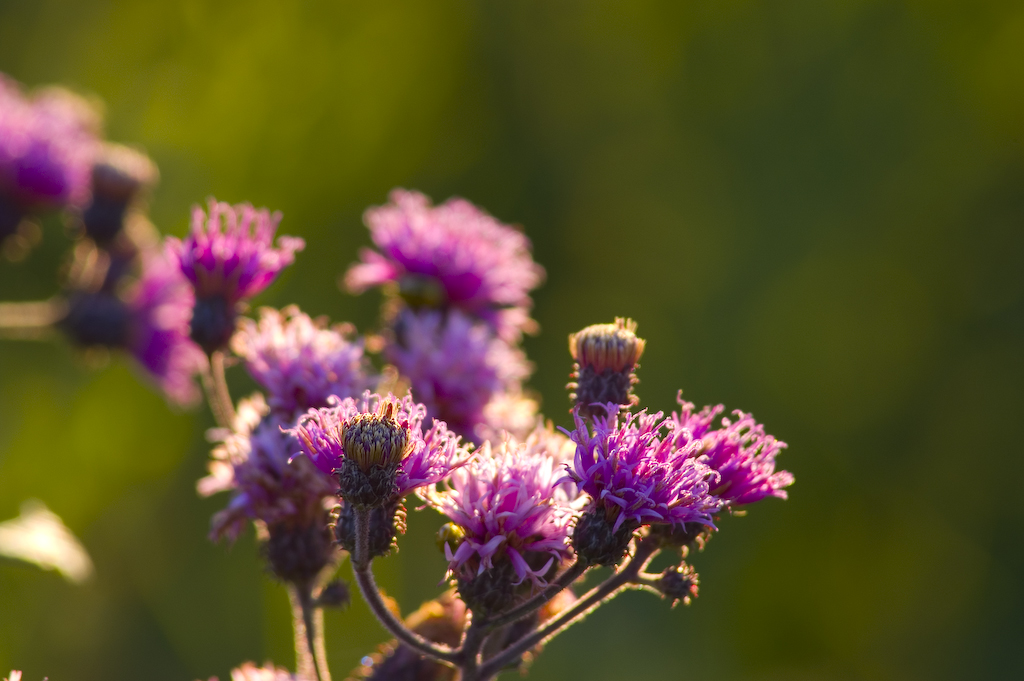
To meddle wi the thistle and to pluck/ The figs frae't is my metier, I think... ll.341-2. The figs = the thistle's flower heads.

A Drunk Man Looks at the Thistle (Scots pronunciation: [ə drʌŋk ˈman luks ət ðə ˈθɪsl̩]) is a long poem by Hugh MacDiarmid written in Scots and published in 1926. It is composed as a form of monologue with influences from stream of consciousness genres of writing. A poem of extremes, it ranges between comic and serious modes and examines a wide range of cultural, sexual, political, scientific, existential, metaphysical and cosmic themes, ultimately unified through one consistent central thread, the poet's affectively charged contemplation, looking askance at the condition of Scotland. It also includes extended and complex responses to figures from European and Russian literature, in particular Fyodor Dostoevsky and Friedrich Nietzsche, as well as referencing topical events and personalities of the mid-1920s such as Isadora Duncan or the UK General Strike of 1926. It is one of the major modernist literary works of the 20th century.

== Description ==
The Scots poem A Drunk Man Looks at the Thistle is an extended montage of distinct poems, or sections in various poetic forms, that are connected or juxtaposed to create one emotionally continuous whole in a way which both develops and consciously parodies compositional techniques used by poets such as Ezra Pound and T. S. Eliot. Much of the poem is comic, especially in its earlier sections, but the rhapsodic structure, 2685 lines long, is able to accommodate broad swings in tone from remarkable lyric passages at one extreme to colourful invective, diatribe and flyting at the other. It ultimately builds to produce deeply serious and even transcendent effects, particularly in the climactic final sections.

One of the most distinctive features of the poem is its language. MacDiarmid's literary Scots is principally rooted in his own Borders dialect, but freely draws on a wide range of idiom and vocabulary, both current and historic, from different regions of Scotland. The work, though sometimes loose and idiosyncratic, did much to increase awareness of the potential for Scots as a medium of universal literary expression at a time when this was not well appreciated. Its expressive drive is integral to the entire effect of the poem.

Some of the poem's initial sections include interpolated Scots translations of other European poets, including Alexander Blok and Else Lasker-Schüler. These introduce the mysterious and lyrical tone that begins to offset the comic persona of the poem's thrawn narrator.

MacDiarmid claimed for his poem national literary ambitions similar to those James Joyce did for Ulysses in Ireland.

== First lines ==
The poem's opening lines run:

I amna fou' sae muckle as tired – deid dune.
It's gey and hard wark coupin' gless for gless
Wi' Cruivie and Gilsanquhar and the like,
And I'm no' juist as bauld as aince I wes.

== Dramatisations ==
A shortened version of the poem, with male and female readers and a score by Cedric Thorpe Davie, was broadcast by the BBC in 1954. The actor Tom Fleming, who was one of the readers for the 1954 radio broadcast, went on to give a reading of the full poem as an Edinburgh International Festival production in 1976. His performance was later broadcast by the BBC in its Saturday Night Theatre series and repeated on Radio 3. Fleming performed the poem again as a Scottish Theatre Company production on 23 May 1986 at the Tron Theatre, Glasgow.

== See also ==
- Modernism
- Existentialism § Dostoevsky
- Scottish Borders
- Scottish national identity
- Robert Burns
- Thistle § Scottish thistle
