= Lennox Milne =

British actress and writer (1909–1980)

Lennox Milne OBE
- Born: Lennox Milne; May 9, 1909; Edinburgh, Scotland
- Died: June 23, 1980 (aged 71); Haddington, East Lothian, Scotland
- Other name: Lennox McLaren
- Occupations: Actress; theatre producer
- Years active: 1953-1980
- Spouse: Moray McLaren (until 1971, his death)

Lennox McLaren OBE (9 May 1909 - 23 June 1980), known professionally as Lennox Milne, was a Scottish actress and theatre producer. "Widely acknowledged to be the leading lady of Scottish theatre", Milne was a constant presence on the stage, with her fifteen appearances at the Edinburgh Festival a record at the time of her death. In addition Milne was a co-founder of the Gateway Theatre Company based at the Edinburgh Gateway Theatre, for which she was awarded an OBE in the 1956 Birthday Honours. Milne was married to the Scottish writer and broadcaster Moray McLaren, with whom she wrote many radio plays, until his death in 1971.

== Life and career ==
=== Early years ===
Born in Edinburgh in 1909, Milne trained at both the Edinburgh College of Drama and London's Royal Academy of Dramatic Art.

=== Career ===
After leaving drama school, Milne worked for the BBC, working on school broadcasts, before stints with the Perth Theatre Company, the Wilson Barrett Company and Glasgow's Citizens Theatre Company.

In 1953, Milne co-founded the Edinburgh Gateway Company with Tom Fleming and Robert Kemp. Milne directed and performed in many of the company's plays. With the company Milne attended the first of her fifteen appearances at the Edinburgh Fringe in 1953, performing in the one woman play The Heart Is Highland. The play was written for Milne by playwright Kemp. Milne played all fourteen characters and it earned her the inaugural Scottish Arts Council Drama Award in 1954. Milne would take the play to Canada's Stratford Festival in 1959. It was for her role in founding and running the company that she was awarded the OBE in the 1956 Birthday Honours.

In 1968, Milne took the role of the headmistress in the Broadway adaptation of the Prime of Miss Jean Brodie, a role she later reprised at the Royal Lyceum Theatre in Edinburgh.

At the Edinburgh Festival, Milne appeared in all of Tyrone Guthrie's The Three Estaites. Milne also often collaborated with the playwright Robert McLellan, including in the title role in the 1950 staging of Mary Stewart, as well as roles in Jamie the Saxt, Young Auchinleck and The Flouers o Edinburgh. She also played the small role of Mrs Gascoyne in the 1967 premiere of D. H. Lawrence's The Daughter-in-Law.

On the radio, Milne played the central character, Chris Guthrie, in Lewis Grassic Gibbon's Sunset Song and its sequel Cloud Howe. She also starred in the radio play One Traveller Returns, which was written by Moray McLaren, her future husband, who she would later frequently collaborate with.

On television, Milne made her debut in a 1951 adaptation of The Daughters of the Late Colonel. She also appeared in Sunset Song, which was based on the novel she had previously played on the radio. She made other appearances in This Man Craig, Dr. Finlay's Casebook, Scotch on the Rocks and Quatermass.

In 1965, Milne became a member of the Scottish Arts Council.

Milne spent her final years living in Haddington, where she worked with the Lamp of Lothian Collegiate Trust until her death in 1980.
