= The Heart Is Highland =

The Heart is Highland is a play by Robert Kemp. It was written for the Scottish actress Lennox Milne, who performed it as a one-person show, playing all fourteen characters, at the end of the Edinburgh Gateway Company's first season in 1954. A television version was produced by the BBC and it had 7 performances at the Stratford Festival in 1959.
