= Moray McLaren =

Moray David Shaw McLaren (1901–1971) was a Scottish writer and broadcasting executive.

== Life ==
Moray was born in Edinburgh in 1901 the son of Dr John Shaw McLaren FRCSE of 14 Walker Street in Edinburgh's fashionable West end

He went to Merchiston Castle School and Corpus Christi College, Cambridge, and spent time in Paris. He worked as assistant editor on the London Mercury, before joining the staff of the British Broadcasting Corporation, where he was assistant editor of The Listener in 1929.

McLaren moved back to Scotland in 1930 as a BBC Scottish Region radio executive, acting as deputy to David Cleghorn Thomson, his work Return to Scotland of that year laying emphasis on his Roman Catholic background. He announced his interest in Scottish nationalism in 1931 by supporting George Malcolm Thomson's pamphlet The Kingdom of Scotland Restored.

During the 1930s, McLaren was transferred to other posts within the BBC. He worked on the Radio Times under Eric Maschwitz. He was in the Talks department. He originated a series on Scottish forensic oratory, from which John Gough's trial drama on Madeleine Smith originated. He was moved in 1935 to become assistant director of Drama and Features under Val Gielgud.

During World War II, he was involved in the Polish section of the Political Warfare Executive. A friend of R. H. Bruce Lockhart who ran the Executive, he was head of its Polish Region, from 1940 to 1945. In a period of poor health, McLaren lost his income. He was supported at this time by Evelyn Waugh.

One of the founders of the Edinburgh Gateway Company, Lennox Milne (1909–1980), was McLaren's wife. The Company worked with him to produce radio scripts.

From 1953 he lived at 29 Inverleith Row in north Edinburgh with his actress wife, Lennox Milne, dying there on 12 July 1971.

== Published works ==
- Return to Scotland: An Egoist's Journey (1932)
- A Wayfarer in Poland (1934)
- A Dinner with the Dead and other stories (1947)
- Escape and Return (1947)
- Stern and Wild: A New Scottish Journey (1948)
- A Small Stir. Letters on the English (1949) with James Bridie
- The House of Neill, 1749–1949 (1949)
- 'By me ... ': a report upon the apparent discovery of some working notes of William Shakespeare in a sixteenth-century book (1949)
- Stevenson and Edinburgh: A Centenary Study (1950, 1974)
- The Scots (1951)
- The Highland Jaunt; A Study of James Boswell and Samuel Johnson upon their Highland and Hebridean Tour of 1773 (1954)
- Scotland in Colour (1954) with photographs by A. F. Kersting
- Sanderson & Murray 1844-1954: Fellmongers and Wool Merchants (1954)
- Understanding the Scots: A Guide for South Britons and Other Foreigners (1956)
- Lord Lovat of the '45: The End of an Old Song (1957)
- The Wisdom of the Scots (1961)
- Union compleat: an humble proposal (1962)
- Compton Mackenzie, a panegyric for his eightieth birthday (1963)
- If Freedom Fail: Bannockburn, Flodden, the Union (1964)
- Pure Wine (1965)
- Corsica Boswell: Paoli, Johnson and Freedom (1966)
- Sir Walter Scott: the Man and Patriot (1970)
- Bonnie Prince Charlie (1972)
- The Shell Guide to Scotland (1973)

== Plays ==
- One Traveller Returns (1954)
- Heather on Fire (1955)
- Muckle Ado (1956)
- The Non-Resident (1957), premiered at The Gateway Theatre
