= Jesus of Nazareth (1956 TV serial) =

1956 British television drama

- Genre: Biblical; Historical drama
- Based on: Gospels
- Directed by: Joy Harington
- Starring: Tom Fleming; Barbara Lott; Gwen Watford; Robert Gillespie; Michael Bryant; Alan Wheatley; Peter Wyngarde
- Country of origin: United Kingdom
- Original language: English
- No. of episodes: 8

Production
- Running time: 240 minutes
- Production company: BBC

Original release
- Network: BBC TV
- Release: 12 February 1956

Jesus of Nazareth is an epic television historical drama serial of 1956 which dramatizes the birth, life, ministry, crucifixion, and resurrection of Jesus.

Broadcast on Sunday afternoons, and aimed largely at children, it was directed by Joy Harington and stars Tom Fleming as Jesus. The open-air parts of the serial were filmed on location in the Holy Land.

== Background ==
This production is believed to be the first in which an actor played Jesus Christ on screen in the United Kingdom. Fleming, who was not a leading actor, was organist, lay preacher, and reader at the Canonmills Baptist church in Edinburgh.

First broadcast in eight parts in February and March 1956, the serial was shown again all through Holy Week of 1957.

== Episodes ==
1. Prologue: Preparing the Way (12 February 1956)
2. The Beloved Son (19 February 1956)
3. Jesus the Healer (26 February 1956)
4. Jesus the Teacher (4 March 1956)
5. Jesus the King (11 March 1956)
6. The Road to Jerusalem (18 March 1956)
7. Behold the Man (25 March 1956)
8. I Am Always With You (1 April 1956)

== Cast ==
- Tom Fleming as Jesus
- Richard Palmer as Boy Jesus
- Barbara Lott as Mary Magdalene
- Michael Bryant as John the Apostle, son of Zebedee
- Robert Gillespie as Matthew the Apostle
- Powys Thomas as Simon Peter
- Philip Guard as Philip the Apostle
- Peter Wyngarde as John the Baptist
- Alan Wheatley as Pontius Pilate
- Philip Latham as Nicodemus
- Anthony Jacobs as Judas Iscariot
- Hugh Dickson as Nathaniel Bartholomew
- Jack Stewart as Simon Zealot
- Gwen Watford as Mary, Mother of Jesus
- George Woodbridge as Joseph
- Ewen Solon as Caiaphas
- John Glen as Andrew and Narrator
- John Dunbar as Thomas
- Richard Grant as James
- John Baker as James, son of Alphaeus
- Alan Rolfe as Thaddeus
- Christopher Sandford as the Boy John
- Charles Lloyd Pack as Sadducee
- Gertan Klauber as woodcutter
- David Ritch as Malchus
- Bartlett Mullins as Zacchaeus
- Roddy Hughes as Bartimaeus
- Maurice Colbourne as Zacharias
- Robert Mooney as Lazarus
- Kenneth Cope as Rich Young Man
- Robert Rietti as Scribe
- Jessica Spencer as Martha
- John Franklyn as Father
- Owen Berry as Scribe
- Kevin Kelly as Little boy
- Blanche Fothergill as Simon's mother-in-law
- Mercia Mansfield as Jairus's Wife
- Julia Puccini as Jairus's daughter
- Donald Cashfield as Jairus's Servant
- Derek Birch as Pharisee
- Kara Aldridge as Woman by the road
- Howell Davies as Man by the road
- David Spenser as Soldier
- Victor Maddern as Stonemason
- Eric Dodson as Rabbi
- Michael Malnick as Elder in the Synagogue
- John Paul as Elder in Synagogue
- Patrick Westwood as First soldier
- Richard Walter as Roman centurion
- Peter Smallwood as Jairus
- Jefferson Clifford as Elder of the Temple
- Jonathan Swift as Boy
- Susan Richmond as Elizabeth
- Rajani Anand as Little Girl
