= The Dreme =

Poem by David Lyndsay

The Dreme is a poem written in 1528 by Scottish herald and poet David Lyndsay. It is his earliest surviving poem, and is an allegorical lament on the misgovernment of the realm.
