= All for Mary =

1955 British film by Wendy Toye

- Directed by: Wendy Toye
- Written by: Peter Blackmore; Paul Soskin; Alan Melville (additional dialogue)
- Based on: the play All for Mary by Harold Brocke & Kay Bannerman
- Produced by: J. Arthur Rank; Paul Soskin
- Starring: Nigel Patrick; Kathleen Harrison; David Tomlinson; Jill Day
- Cinematography: Reginald H. Wyer
- Edited by: Frederick Wilson
- Music by: Robert Farnon
- Production company: Group Film Productions
- Distributed by: J. Arthur Rank Film Distributors (UK)
- Release date: 21 December 1955; (UK)
- Running time: 79 minutes
- Country: United Kingdom
- Language: English

All for Mary is a 1955 British comedy film directed by Wendy Toye and starring Nigel Patrick, David Tomlinson, Jill Day and Kathleen Harrison. It was written by Peter Blackmore, Paul Soskin and Alan Melville based on the successful West End play of the same title by Kay Bannerman and Harold Brooke, and was produced by Paul Soskin Productions for the Rank Organisation.

The film had an original copyright notice with a renewal in 1983.

== Plot ==
Two young bachelors take separate skiing holidays at the same resort. Clive Morton and "Humpy" Miller have nothing whatsoever in common –except for one thing: both men fall for the hotel proprietor's daughter Mary. Clive (a debonair soldier and sportsman) gets quickly into his stride, whilst poor "Humpy" – a clumsy, incongruous fellow – looks on dumbly. However, "Humpy" has a secret weapon: Miss Cartwright, his former nanny, who arrives just as the pair are quarantined in the hotel attic after contracting chicken pox. Quickly realising Humpy's predicament, she skillfully arranges for the removal of the opposition, leaving the way clear for "Humpy".

== Cast ==
- Nigel Patrick as Captain Clive Norton
- Kathleen Harrison as Nanny Cartwright
- David Tomlinson as "Humpy" Miller
- Jill Day as Mary
- David Hurst as Monsieur Victor
- Leo McKern as Gaston Nikopopoulos
- Nicholas Phipps as General McLintock-White
- Joan Young as Mrs. Hackenfleuger
- Lionel Jeffries as maître d'hotel
- Neil Hallett as Alphonse
- Paul Hardtmuth as Hans, hotel porter
- Fabia Drake as opulent lady
- Charles Lloyd Pack as doctor
- Guy Deghy as ski instructor
- Dorothy Gordon as W.R.A.C. orderly
- Robin Brown as American boy
- Tommy Farr as bruiser
- Vernon Morris as page boy

== Original play ==
All for Mary
- Original language: English
- Written by: Harold Brooke; Kay Bannerman
- Genre: comedy
- Setting: The top floor of Hotel Splendide at a winter sports resort in the French Alps

Premiere
- Date: September 9, 1954
- Place: Duke of York's Theatre, London
- Directed by: Jack Williams

The film was based on a play which debuted in 1954. Kathleen Harrison and David Tomlinson played key roles and the production ran for nine months in London.

Variety called it "a nonsensical comedy".

== Production ==
The film was announced in January 1955 as part of Rank's slate for that year.

It was directed by Wendy Toye, who had joined the Rank Organisation after being under contract to Alex Korda. She later stated "they got me and they didn’t know what to do with me much and I think they had All for Mary on their hands and thought as she had been a theatre director that had been in the theatre, maybe that would be good subject for her."

Troye had a difficult relationship with producer Paul Soskin who she called "ridiculous".

Probably a remarkable man, but he was very, very Russian, held his cigarette in the wrong fingers and all that, and didn't understand English jokes at all. And there he was... seeing the rushes and deciding whether it was funny or not. Which seemed to be fairly bizarre to me. And there was a point when we actually managed to succeed to shut him out of the studio when we were shooting. We put the red light on.

The film had a four-week shoot with work in Pinewood and on location in . Maurice Carter, who did the design, recalled:

It had all the problems of snow. Every shot you do you have to move again because you can see the traces of the last shot in the snow. So if you wanted virgin snow, somebody approaching there was no rehearsal or else you had to move on. It was the time the guys were climbing the Iger. We were living in the hotel at the foot of the Iger mountain and we used to operate and from there. And Paul Soskin... who was producing used to sit on the terrace with his drink and his family and watch us through his binoculars. And he would send messages up via the ski-lift saying what are you doing now, I've seen you sitting down for 10 minutes. When do we get the next shot. Chasing us up constantly.

== Critical reception ==
The Monthly Film Bulletin wrote: "The main joke here consists of two adult men being treated as infants; and despite Nigel Patrick's slightly frantic attempts to force humour from the situation, the result is on the whole more embarrassing than comic. Kathleen Harrison enlivens matters somewhat as the resolute nannie, but the director and the rest of the cast seem stymied by a script with so little to offer in the way of novelty or wit."

Kine Weekly wrote: "The picture neatly interleaves its cross-talk with songs, slapstick and exhilarating scenes of ski-ing, and Eastman Color strengthens its holiday atmosphere. Nigel Patrick and David Tomlinson score in contrast and set the ball rolling as the exuberant Clive and the fumbling Humpy respectively, Leo Mckern amuses as the explodve Gaston, and Jill Day acts naturally and sings pleasantly as Marv but none has anything on Kathleen Harrison. She holds the play logether, as the conniving, proverb-quoting Ranny, who insists upon treating grown-ups as children."

Variety wrote: "This is all very immature comedy stuff, making no pretension toward sophistication and relying for reaction on broad farce situations. The performers are in the right key, and apart from the two male stars, David Tomlinson and Nigel Patrick, Kathleen Harrison collars top honors as the woman who can only converse in nursery rhymes. Jill Day is a lush newcomer, who sings adequately and looks attractive enough. David Hurst as a voluble hotel proprietor and Leo McKern as the defeated suitor are at the head of an average supporting cast. Wendy Tove's direction displays an adequate vigor."

Picture Show wrote: "Gay adaptation of the hit stage play of the same title. ... Beautifully set and acted, with lilting tunes, the film provides very pleasant entertainment."

Leslie Halliwell called the film a "simple-minded farce." Filmink said the film "is based around one joke (a nanny treats her former charges, now grown men, like children)... The photography is lovely, the fun mild."

In The Radio Times Guide to Films Tom Hutchinson gave the film 2/5 stars, calling the film an "unfunny comedy " and adding "Sadly, director Wendy Toye takes the joke no further, so all we get is a feeble production that only weakly echoes its successful West End stage origins."

TV Guide wrote: "This tired old formula is given the standard British treatment, resulting in an enjoyable, but far from classic comedy."

== 1958 TV Play ==
The play was adapted for American television in 1958.

Reviewing it, Variety declared " although it had the advantage of a topnotch performance and excellent direction, this... must have been much funier in the theatre."
