= Kay Bannerman =

British actress and screenwriter (1919–1991)

- Born: 11 October 1919; Hove, United Kingdom
- Died: 31 March 1991 (aged 71); Marbella, Spain

Kay Bannerman (11 October 1919 – 31 March 1991) was a British actress and screenwriter.

== Biography ==
Kay Bannerman was born on 11 October 1919 in Hove, Sussex, England. She was the daughter of Captain Robert George Bannerman and Chicot Mowat. Bannerman grew up in Scotland and France. Bannerman trained in the Royal Academy of Dramatic Art. Bannerman performed on stage. She married Nikita Bruce, but they divorced in 1945. Bannerman then went on to marry Harold Brooke. Together they wrote a number of screenplays, the best known of which was All for Mary. Some of her plays were adapted for the screen.

Bannerman had two daughters with Brooke, Theresa and Vicky. She died 31 March 1991 in Marbella, Spain.

== Stage ==
- Emmanuele in Asmodée (1939)
- Suzanne in Prison Without Bars (1939)
- Sarah in Major Barbara (1939)
- Ann Sheldon in Other People's Houses (1942)
- Mary Jefferson in One Flight Up (1942)
- Raina in Arms and the Man (1943)
- Polina in The Gambler (1945)
- Diana Temple in High Horse (1946)

== Screenplays ==
- Fit for Heroes (1945)
- The Nest Egg (1952)
- All For Mary (1954)
- The Call of the Dodo (1955)
- Handful of Tansy (1959)
- Don't Tell Father (1962)
- The Snowman (1965)
- She Was Only an Admiral's Daughter (1972)
- Take Zero (1974)
