= Joy Harington =

English television actor, writer, producer and director (1914–1991)

Joy Harington (22 February 1914, London – 22 October 1991, Bristol) was an English television actress, writer, producer, and director.

Harington first acted professionally in 1933 and settled in the US in 1938 and toured in theatrical productions before working as a dialogue director and script editor at Paramount Pictures. She acted (usually uncredited) in several Hollywood productions, including Gaslight and National Velvet (both 1944).

Harington returned to London after the Second World War, joining BBC television as a stage manager. In 1950, she became a producer for BBC Children's Television. She was involved in the production of many programmes during this period, including Treasure Island (1951), Jo's Boys, and Billy Bunter of Greyfriars School.

Harington is best known for her work on the eight-part children's television series Jesus of Nazareth (1956), which was broadcast live, although it did contain pre-filmed exterior sequences shot in Galilee and Jerusalem. The project was controversial because at the time it was not legal for an actor to portray Jesus in a public performance; however, an exception was made for this series and it was widely seen as a success. Harington received an award in 1956 from the Guild of Television Directors and Producers (now known as BAFTA), marking the first time a children's programme was awarded such an honour. She wrote and produced a subsequent biblical serial called Paul of Tarsus (1960).

Harington retired in 1970 after working in religious, schools and further education broadcasting and returned to acting. In 1972-1973 she starred in the television series Thursday's Child. She died in Bristol in 1991.
