= Robert Kemp (playwright) =

Scottish playwright (1908–1967)

- Born: 25 February 1908; Longhope, Orkney, Scotland
- Died: 25 November 1967; Edinburgh
- Occupations: Journalist, Playwright
- Children: Arnold Kemp
- Writing career
- Language: Scots, English
- Notable works: Let Wives Tak Tent (1948), The Other Dear Charmer (1953)
- Movement: Scottish Renaissance

Robert Kemp (1908 – 1967) was a Scottish playwright. Along with Tom Fleming and Lennox Milne, he was a founder of the Edinburgh Gateway Company (1953–1965).

== Biography ==
He was born in 1908, at Longhope in Orkney, where his father was the minister. Educated at Robert Gordon's College and the University of Aberdeen, he lived in London and then in Edinburgh (in Warriston Crescent).

Before turning to drama, Kemp trained as a journalist with The Guardian. In 1937 he joined the BBC as assistant public relations officer to George Burnett at Broadcasting House, Edinburgh. He moved to the BBC's new studios at Queen Margaret Drive, Glasgow, in May 1938. Late in 1938 he was transferred to the drama and features department in London to work as a producer. Immediately prior to the Second World War he was seconded, along with 38 other BBC staff, to the Ministry of Information. On returning to the BBC in Scotland in 1942 established Chapbook, a radio magazine featuring poetry and music. His wartime programmes included a feature to mark the first anniversary of the evacuation from Dunkirk, Operation Dynamo, which he adapted for broadcast from John Masefield's Nine Days' Wonder. His St. Andrew's Day broadcast of 1942, Pioneers, was one of a number of programmes which re-evaluated Scotland's cultural heritage.

From the time he adapted Molière's L'Ecole des Femmes for the Scottish stage in 1947 he sought to promote a distinctly national drama, often employing Scots dialogue. His A Trump for Jericho, a comedy set in the New Town of Edinburgh at the time of the Disruption in 1843, was first performed by the Scottish National Players in 1947 under the title The Walls of Jericho. His adaptation of Joseph Mitchell's Highland Fair was performed at the first Edinburgh International Festival under the direction of Tyrone Guthrie in the same year.

Kemp also wrote plays for the Glasgow Citizens and Dundee Repertory Theatre. In 1948, working again with Tyrone Guthrie, he staged a revival of Scotland's first Scottish play, David Lyndsay's Ane Pleasant Satyre of the Thrie Estaitis and, also in 1948, he coined the phrase "Edinburgh Festival Fringe". His adaptation of Allan Ramsay's The Gentle Shepherd was staged at the Assembly Hall of the Church of Scotland in 1949. His pageant play The Saxon Saint, about the arrival of Princess Margaret in Scotland in 1068, was staged as an Edinburgh Festival production in the nave of Dunfermline Abbey in the same year.

Kemp's The Other Dear Charmer, about the doomed love affair between Robert Burns and Agnes Maclehose, was first broadcast as a radio play on the Scottish Home Service on 22 January 1951, and then as BBC Scotland's first television studio drama on the BBC-tv network on 27 January 1953. It was staged by the Gateway Theatre Company during its 1953-54 season. A second television dramatisation of the play was produced by Pharic Maclaren for the bicentenary of Robert Burns' birth and first broadcast on the BBC-tv network on Tuesday 27 January 1959. It starred Rona Anderson and Tom Fleming.

in 1958, Kemp's The Penny Wedding was toured by the Gateway Company as part of the Festival of Scottish Repertory Theatre.

Kemp died of a thrombotic stroke on 25 November 1967 in the Western General Hospital, Edinburgh, at the age of 59.

== Published work ==
Robert Kemp's plays include:

- Let Wives Tak Tent (1948): a free translation into Scots of Molière's L'école des femmes inspired by the Compagnie Jouvet of Paris's production of the play at the first Edinburgh International Festival in 1947
- A Trump for Jericho (1947), Brown, Son & Ferguson Ltd. (1985) and Players Press (1996)
- The Heart is Highland (1954)
- The Laird o' Grippy (1954): a free translation into Scots of Molière's L'avare (The Miser)
- The Penny Wedding (1957), Brown, Son & Ferguson Ltd. (1985)
- The Scientific Singers / A Nest of Singing Birds (1955 / 1957), Brown, Son & Ferguson Ltd. (1985)
- Off A Duck's Back (1961)
- The Other Dear Charmer, Brown, Son & Ferguson Ltd. (1985)
- The Perfect Gent (1962)
- The Asset (play)
- Master John Knox, St. Andrew Press (1960)
- Venom for Two, Brown, Son & Ferguson Ltd. (1985)

== Other plays ==
- Seven Bottles for the Maestro (1945)
- When the Star Fell (1946), a nativity play staged for Christmas at the Church of Scotland's Gateway Theatre at 41 Elm Row, Edinburgh
- Conspirators (1955)
- Marigold (1955), a musical play, with music by Cedric Thorpe Davie
- The Man Among the Roses (1956), a verse play based on the ballad of Tam Lin
- The Daft Days (1957), adapted from the novel by Neil Munro
- Rob Roy (1960), adapted from the novel by Sir Walter Scott
