= A Satire of the Three Estates =

Play written by David Lyndsay

- Detail from the front cover of the programme for John McGrath's 1996 adaptation.
- Original language: Scots
- Written by: David Lyndsay
- Genre: Morality play

Premiere
- Date: 1540 (private) / 1552 (public)
- Place: Edinburgh, Scotland

A Satire of the Three Estates (Middle Scots: Ane Pleasant Satyre of the Thrie Estaitis), is a satirical morality play in Middle Scots, written by the makar Sir David Lyndsay. The complete play was first performed outside in the playing field at Cupar, Fife, in June 1552 during the Midsummer holiday, where the action took place under Castle Hill. It was subsequently performed in Edinburgh, also outdoors, in 1554. The full text was first printed in 1602, and extracts were copied into the Bannatyne Manuscript. The Satire is an attack on the Three Estates represented in the Parliament of Scotland – the clergy, lords and burgh representatives, symbolised by the characters Spiritualitie, Temporalitie and Merchant. The clergy come in for the strongest criticism. The work portrays the social tensions present at this pivotal moment in Scottish history.

== Synopsis ==
A complete version of the play was printed by Robert Charteris as, Ane (Pleasant) Satyre of the Thrie Estaits, in Commendation of Vertew and Vituperation of Vyce, Edinburgh (1602). (Note: "Pleasant" appears in the title on the first page of the play, not on the title-page of Charteris's (1602) edition.) In the first part there are 27 different characters. In the second part 7 more are added. The key characters are: King Humanity, Divine Correction, Sensuality, Spirituality, Temporality, Gude Counsel and Chastity.

The play opens with Diligence delivering a sermon on good kingship. The main character, young King Humanity, then appears and is at first led astray by Sensuality and the Vices. His false counsellors introduce him to a mistress, Sensuality, which is the starting point of his disconnection from the moral way of life. He is then fooled by three disguised liars. Gude Counsel is sent to prison by the liars who already have taken control of King Humanitie's mind. With the beginning of his lecherous new life the king forgets about the moral virtues and can no longer judge properly. He consigns Charity and Verity to the stocks. In the course of the following scenes the audience sees how the three so called Vices (Discretion, Devotion and Sapience) try to get rid of everything and everyone who could be dangerous to them. For instance Lady Chastitie, who is homeless since the church in Scotland is not as it was meant to be, begs for shelter from Spiritualitie, Temporalitie and finally the People but is rejected in each case. In the end when Lady Chastitie is sent to prison by the Vices, Divine Correction enters the stage. This is the moment when the vices know that their time has come to an end and they flee and take away the king's treasure box. Correction frees Gude Counsel, Chastitie and Vertie. He advises the young king to call a parliament and gives him advice regarding a successful reign.

The second part starts with an interruption. A member of the King's realm, known only as The Poor Man, emerges from the audience, establishes an alliance with John Commonweal to demand reform, and Diligence reappears to announce that the King will seek to improve his realm. Afterwards the Pardoner enters the scene and tries to sell pardoners. Poor Man hears that and buys pardoners worth ‘ane groat’. But Poor Man is not satisfied and gets angry and so they start to argue. In the following scene Diligence opens parliament and King Humanitie, Correction, the king's courtiers and the virtues enter. The three estates greet the king and parliament is opened. John Commonweal stands up and talks to the King and Correction. He reveals all the failures of the estates. In the course of the following hearing Temporalitie gets punished but as this estate wants to cooperate this is just a short episode. Spiritualitie does not agree on what is said about their estate and fights back. But there are too many accusations against this estate and therefore they also have to give in. The three Vices are imprisoned and sentenced to be hanged. Flatterie tried to get away by betraying his fellows Falsehood and Deceit but this did not work. In the end of the second part the three vices Deceit, Falsehood and Flatterie are allowed to say something before they are hanged. After the execution of the vices and a rousing speech by Folie, Diligence closes the play and advises the audience to go their ways and enjoy their time.

== Early performances ==
=== Interlude at Linlithgow, 1540 ===
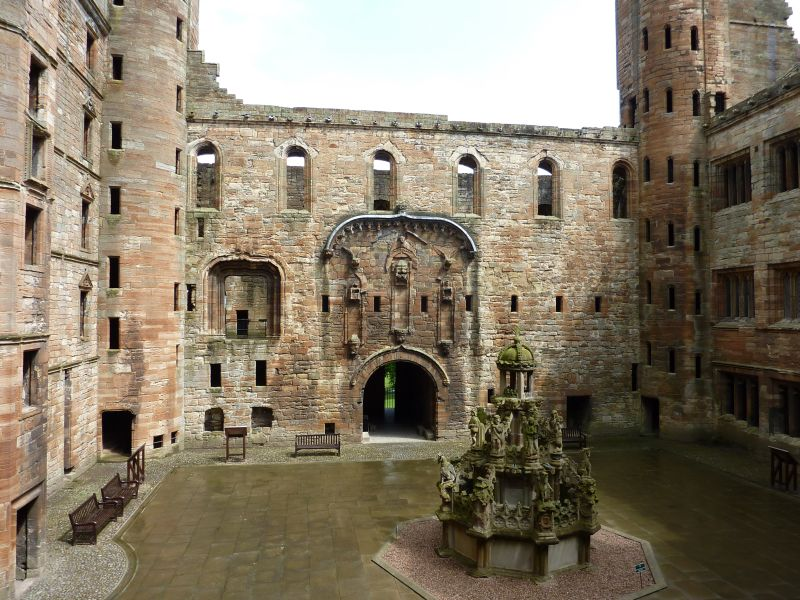
The 1540 interlude was performed in the hall of Linlithgow Palace

The 1931 edition of Lindsay's works by Douglas Hamer hypothesized different forms of the play. The critic John MacQueen proposed the play might have been composed by Lindsay as early as 1532 for the court of the young James V of Scotland. An early form of the play is recorded in the royal treasurer's accounts and an English agent's report to Thomas Cromwell. This short play or 'interlude' performed in January 1540 used characters who later appeared in the Satyre of the Thrie Estaitis, and had the same themes.

A letter written by the Englishman William Eure to Thomas Cromwell on 26 January 1540 gives a description of the interlude. Eure, a Border Warden and Privy Councillor, had spoken to Sir Thomas Bellenden at Coldstream, who described the performance at Linlithgow Palace before James, his wife Mary of Guise and his bishops and council on the feast of the Epiphany. As the play turned on the Reformation of the church, Eure obtained a more detailed description from a Scottish contact who saw the play at Linlithgow, and enclosed in his letter the synopsis written by his spy . This description corresponds with the expanded later text of Lindsay's play. A king was shown with his courtiers, Placebo, Picthanke, and Flatterye. A Poor Man made his complaint, and was answered by a Burgess, a Man at Arms and a Bishop, who represented the three estates of the Parliament of Scotland. The Poor Man mentioned the real events of James V executing both John Armstrong (of Staplegordon; in ballads the Laird o'Gilnockie), hanged in July 1530, and 'Sym the Laird,' who was hanged in February 1536. The role of the poor man was described in the spy's synopsis;

"After them come a poor Man, who did go up and down the scaffald, making a heavy complaint that he was harried (chased) through the Courtier's place, where through he hade strayled (lost) his house, his wife and children beggyng thair bread, and so of many thousand in Scotland, whiche would make the Kyng's Grace lose of men if his Grace stod neide (required), saying there was no remedy to be gotten, for though he would suite to the King's Grace, he was neither acquainted with Controller nor Treasurer, and without them might no man get no goodness of the King. And after, he spered (asked) for the King, and when he was shewed the Man that was King in the play, he answered and said he was no King, for there was but one King, which made all and governethe all, who is eternal, to whom he and all earthly Kings are but officers, of the which they must make reckoning. And so forth much more to that effect. And then he looked to the King, and said he was not the King of Scotland, for there was another King in Scotland that hanged John Armestrang with his fellowes, and Sym the Larde, and many other more, which had pacified the country, and stanched theft, but he had left one thing undone, which pertained as well to his charge as th'other. And when he was asked what that was, he made a long narration of the oppression of the poor, by the taking of the 'corse presaunte beists' (animals due as tithes at funerals), and of the harrying of poor men by Consistory law, and of many other abussions of the spiritualitie and Churche, with many long stories and authorities."

Eure said he had talked with Bellenden, a member of the council of James V about the possibility of a Reformation of the 'spirituality' in Scotland. The play at Linlithgow had shown the 'naughtiness' of the church. Bellenden said after the play the King spoke to the churchmen in the audience asking them to reform their factions and manner of living, otherwise he would send six of them into England to his uncle, Henry VIII.

=== The Cupar Banns, 1552 ===
The performance at Cupar on 7 June 1552 was heralded by a short piece called the Cupar Banns announcing the play, presumably also written by Lindsay. This has three sections of comic drama as a foretaste of the Satire; the Cotter and his wife, Bessy and the Auld Man, and Fynlaw of the Foot Band, introduced by the 'Nuncius' and linked by the Fool. The characters of the three parts are supposed to be members of the Satire's audience. The Banns with some stage directions are found only in the Bannatyne Manuscript.

=== Edinburgh, 1554, and the Charteris synopsis ===
Some preparations for the Edinburgh performance on Sunday 14 August 1554 were made by the Burgh Council. William MacDowall with six carpenters built a stage of boards, a seat for Mary of Guise and the French ambassador Henri Cleutin, and a 'Convoy House', at the Greenside playfield, with the gallows, 'jebbettis,' used in the final scene. The town council paid the wages of 12 minstrels, and after the play treated the actors to dinner.

The printer Henry Charteris mentioned the Edinburgh performance in his introduction to Lindsay's Warkis (1568), saying how the clergy were surprised by the play and considered taking revenge. Charteris gave this summary of the Satire;

"In the play, playit beside Edinburgh, in the presence of the Quene Regent, and ane greit part of the nobilitie, with ane exceeding greit nowmber of pepill. lestand fra 9 houris afoir none till 6 houris at evin, quhair, amangis mony baith grave materis and merie trickis, he brocht in ane Bischop, ane Persone (Parson), ane Freir, and ane Nun, deckit up in their papisticall ornamentis and maner of raiment. And theirefter broicht in King Correction, quha reformand sindie deformities in his realme, passit to the tryall of the Clergie. And findand thame to be altogether Idiotis, unworthie of ony functioun ecclesiasticall, dicernit thame to be degradit of their dignateis, and spulzeit (deprived) of their offices, quhilk beand executit, thay war fund bot verray fulis, hypocrites, flatteris & nouchtie persones."

The Bannatyne Manuscript contains only selected "merry interludes" from the 1554 Greenside performance, the copyist George Bannatyne omitted the "grave matter" because the church had been reformed in reality in the 1560 Scottish Reformation Parliament, and he noted, "the samyne abuse is weill reformit in Scotland." Stage directions in the Bannatyne Manuscript mention the settings of "houses", the "King's seat" and "palyeoun" tent, and props for the scene of the Poor Man and the Pardoner, "Heir thay feight togeddir and the puir man sall cast doun the burd and cast the rillickis in the watter."

== Later performances ==
The play's first complete modern production occurred on August 24, 1948, at the Edinburgh International Festival, with a modernised text by Robert Kemp, directed by Tyrone Guthrie, costumes designed by Molly MacEwen, and featuring Stanley Baxter. It was staged again during the Festival in 1959.

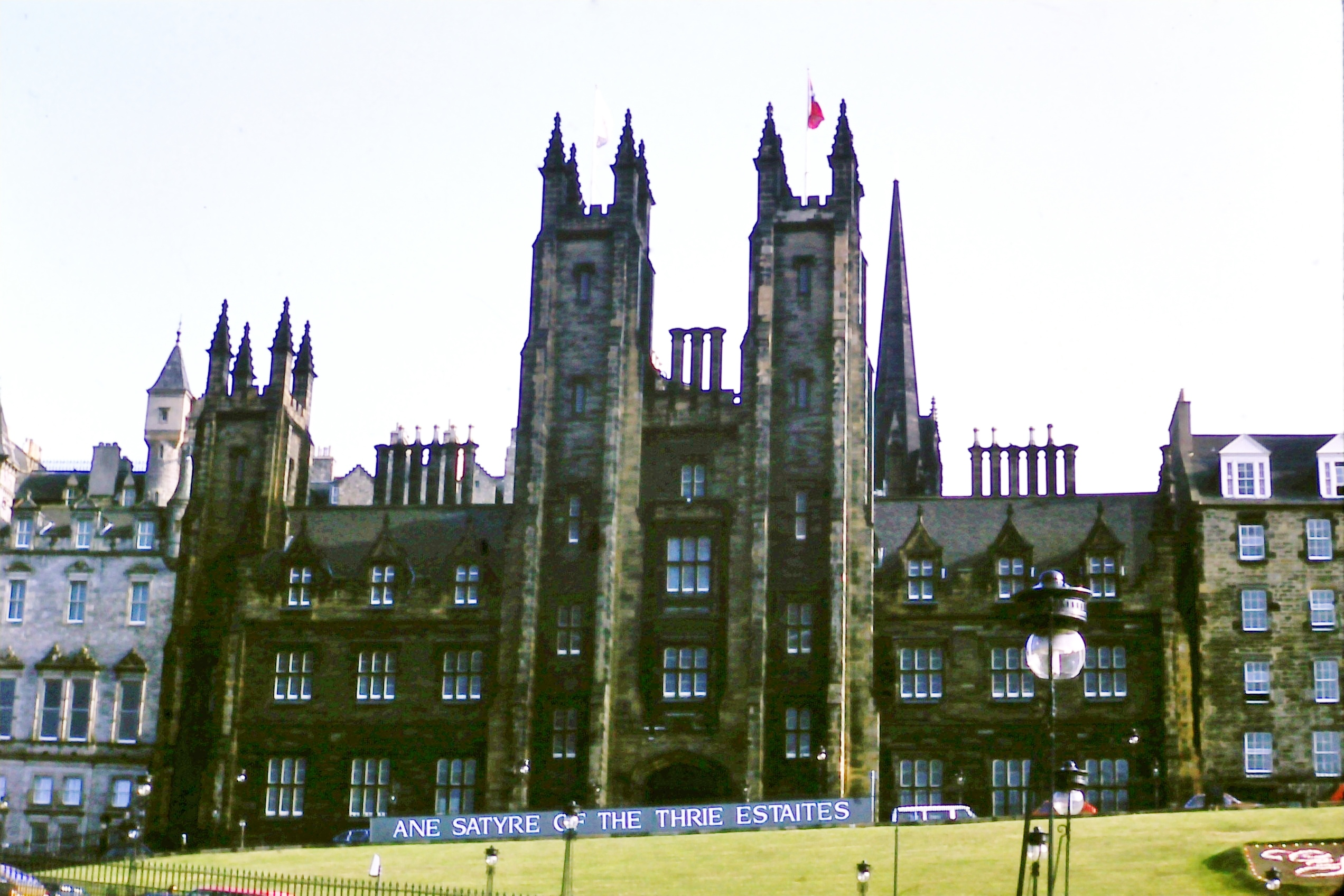
The Assembly Hall, New College, Edinburgh, was the venue for the 1982 Edinburgh International Festival production

Simon Callow and Fulton Mackay acted in a 1973 Edinburgh Festival production. In 1982 the play was staged again at the Assembly Hall as a Festival production with the collaboration of the Scottish Theatre Company under the direction of Tom Fleming.

Mary McCluskey directed a performance by young people in July 1996 as part of Scottish Youth Theatre's Summer Festival. The script was translated into modern Scots by Fiona McGarry, and the play was performed in the round in The Cottier Theatre, Glasgow, with an original score.

John McGrath adapted the play as a contemporary morality A Satire of the Four Estaites, which was presented by Wildcat Stage Productions at the Edinburgh International Conference Centre as part of the Edinburgh International Festival, also in 1996. This production opened on 16 August 1996 and starred Sylvester McCoy.

The play was quoted at the opening of the new Scottish Parliament, a mark illustrating its importance to modern Scots.

A new performance at Linlithgow Palace and Stirling Castle based on the story of the 1540 interlude took place in 2013 using a cast drawn from stage and screen. In Linlithgow an open-air stage was erected on the Peel looking out across the loch for the performance.

== Language ==
The Satire is notable for being one of the earliest recorded instances of fuck, predating any English language forms but preceded in the Scots language by the makar William Dunbar (Oxford English Dictionary entry.)

== Excerpt from the 1602 text ==
A complete version of the play was printed in 1602, see external links for an edition of the text. In this extract Diligence meets the Pauper, who begins his complaint, including the practice of the parish priest claiming livestock at funerals which was mentioned in the 1540 interlude, (Lines 1954–2028);

DILIGENCE:
Swyith begger bogill, haist the away,
Thow art over pert to spill our play.

PAUPER:
I wil not gif for al ȝour play worth an sowis fart,
For thair is richt lytill play at my hungrie hart.

DILIGENCE: Quhat Devill ails this cruckit carle?

PAUPER:
Marie Meikill sorrow :
I can not get, thocht I gasp, to beg, nor to borrow

DILIGENCE: Quhair deuill is this thou dwels or quhats thy intent?

PAUPER: I dwell into Lawthiane ane myle fra Tranent.

DILIGENCE: Quhair wald thou be, carle, the suth to me shaw?

PAUPER: Sir, evin to Sanct-Androes for to seik law.

DILIGENCE: For to seik law in Edinburgh was the neirest way.

PAUPER:
Sir I socht law thair this monie deir day;
Bot I culd get nane at sessioun nor Seinȝe :
Thairfoir the mekill dum Deuill droun all the meinȝe.

DILIGENCE:
Shaw me thy mater, man, with al the circumstances,
How that thou hes happinit on thir vnhappie chances.

PAUPER:
Gude-man will ȝe gif me ȝour Charitie,
And I sall declair how the black veritie.
My father was ane auld man and ane hoir,
And was of age fourscoir of ȝeirs and moir;
And Mald, my mother was fourscoir and fyfteine :
And with my labour I did thame baith sustein.
Wee had ane Meir, that caryit salt and coill,
And everie ilk ȝeir scho brocht vs hame ane foill.
Wee had thrie ky that was baith fat and fair,
Nane tydier into the toun of Air.
My father was sa waik of blude and bane,
That he deit, quhairfoir my mother maid great maine.
Then scho deit within ane day or two;
And thair began my povertie and wo.
Our gude gray Meir was baittand on the feild,
And our Lands Laird tuike hir for his hyreild.
The Vickar tuik the best Cow be the head,
Incontinent, quhen my father was deid.
And quhen the Vickar hard tel how that my mother
Was dead, fra-hand he tuke to him ane vther.
Then meg my wife did murne both evin & morrow
Till at the last scho deit for verrie sorow :
And quhen the Vickar hard tell my wyfe was dead,
The third cow he cleikit be the head.
Thair vmest clayis, that was of rapploch gray,
The Vickar gart his Clark bear them away.
Quhen all was gaine, I micht mak na debeat,
Bot with my bairns past for till beg my meat.
Now haue I tald ȝow the black veritie,
How I am brocht into this miserie.

DILIGENCE: How did the person, was he not thy gude friend?

PAUPER:
The devil stick him, he curst me for my teind,
And halds me ȝit vnder that same proces,
That gart me want the Sacrament at Pasche.
In gude faith, sir, Thocht he wald cut my throt,
I haue na geir except ane Inglis grot,
Quhilk I purpois to gif ane man of law.

DILIGENCE:
Thou art the daftest fuill that ever I saw.
Trows thou, man, be the law to get remeid
Of men of kirk? Na, nocht till thou be deid.

PAUPER: Sir, be quhat law tell me, quhairfoir, or quhy
That ane Vickar sould tak fra me thrie ky?

DILIGENCE:
Thay haue na law, exceptand consuetude,
Quhilk law to them is sufficient and gude.

PAUPER:
Ane consuetude against the common weill
Sould be na law I think be sweit Sanct Geill.
Quhair will ȝe find that law tell gif ȝe can
To tak thrie ky fra ane pure husband man?
Ane for my father, and for my wyfe ane vther,
And the third Cow he tuke for Mald my mother.

DILIGENCE:
It is thair law all that thay haue in vse,
Thocht it be Cow, Sow, Ganar, Gryce, or Guse.

PAUPER:
Sir, I wald speir at ȝow ane questioun.
Behauld sum Prelats of this Regioun:
Manifestlie during thair lustie lyvfis,
Thay swyfe Ladies, Madinis and vther mens wyfis.
And sa thair cunts thay haue in consuetude.
Quhidder say ȝe that law is evill or gude?

== See also ==
- Scottish literature

== External links and editions ==
- Staging the Scottish Court: research and rehearsal for the 2013 revival of Lindsay's Play & Interlude
- The complete 1602 text: Hall, Fitzedward, ed., Ane satyre of the thrie estaits, Trübner / EETS
- Pinkerton, John, ed., Scottish Poems: Lindsay's Eight interludes from the Bannatyne Manuscript, vol. 2, London (1792)
- Eleanor Rycroft, "Staging Kingship in Scotland and England, 1532–1560", Journal of the Northern Renaissance, 2019
