= David Lyndsay =

Scottish herald and poet

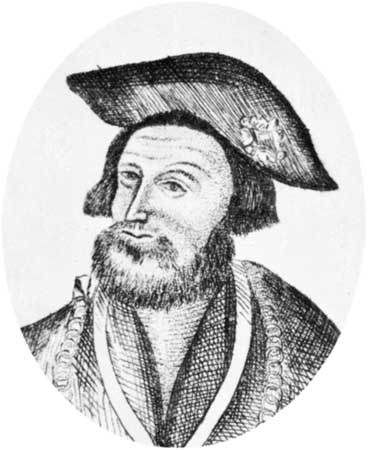
Sir David Lyndsay

Sir David Lyndsay of the Mount (c. 1486 – c. 1555; surname sometimes transcribed as Lindsay) was a Scottish knight, poet, and herald who gained the highest heraldic office of Lyon King of Arms. He remains a well regarded poet whose works reflect the spirit of the Renaissance, specifically as a makar.

== Biography ==
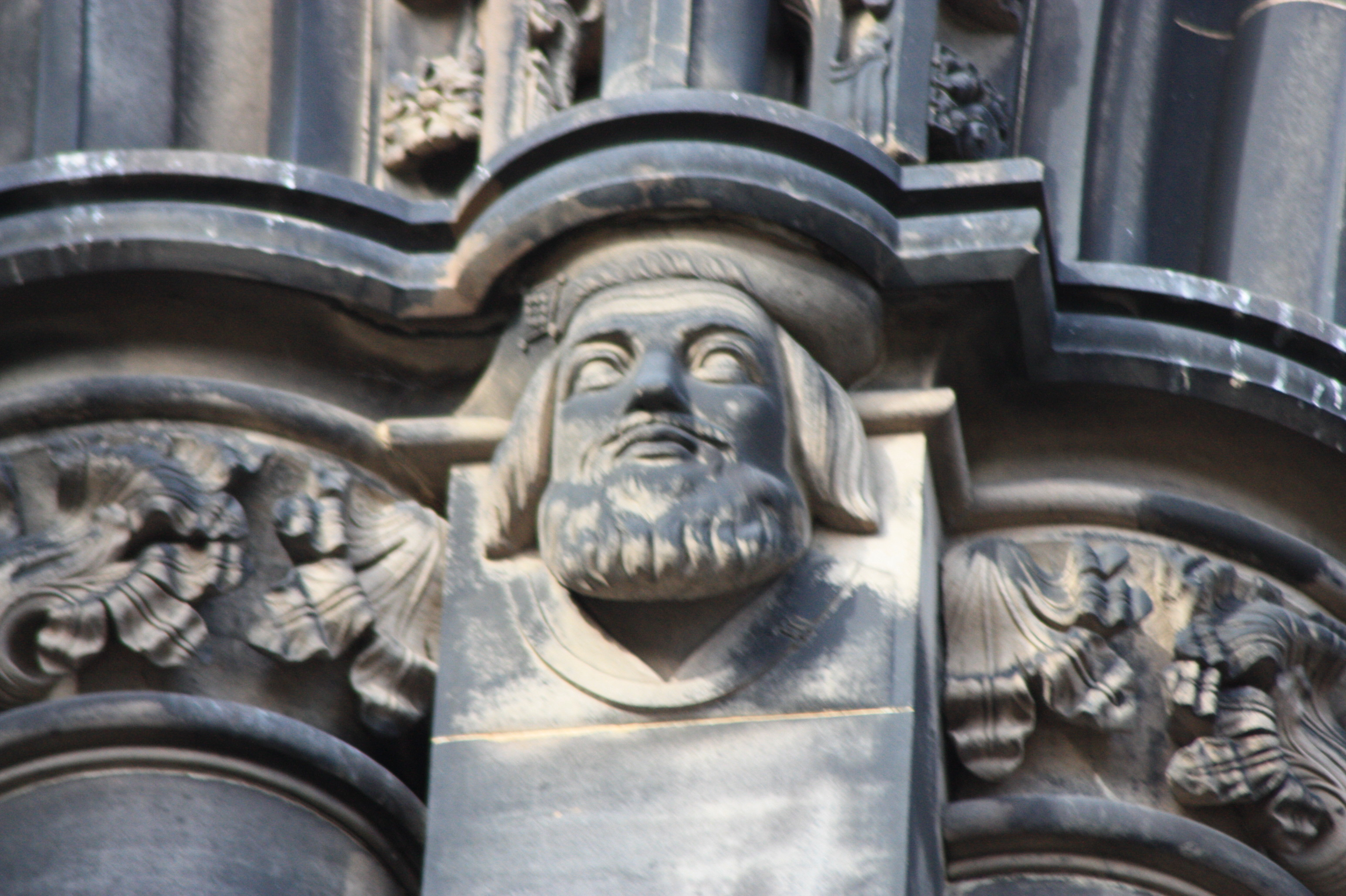
Lyndsay as depicted on the Scott Monument

He was the son of David Lyndsay – second of the Mount (Fife), and of Garmylton (Haddingtonshire) – who died circa 1503. Lyndsay the younger's place of birth and early education are unknown, but he may have attended the University of St Andrews, on the books of which appears an entry "Da Lindesay" for the session 1508–1509. He was engaged as a courtier in the Royal Household; first as an equerry, then as an usher to the future King James V of Scotland. His poems mention that he was involved in the education of James V and some contain advice for the young king.

The Treasurer's Accounts are missing from September 1518 to June 1522. When they recommence, they record a "Jenet Dowglas, spous to David Lindsay maister Ischare to the King" who was a seamstress at court. Thus, it may be inferred that Lyndsay married, in or around 1522, Janet Douglas, who worked making and embroidering the young king's shirts.

His first heraldic appointment was as Snowdon Herald and in 1529 he was appointed Lord Lyon King of Arms, and knighted. Some sources cite 1542 as the year of his appointment. He was engaged in diplomatic business (twice abroad in the Netherlands and France), and was, in virtue of his heraldic office, a general master of ceremonies. He was involved in organising the ceremonies and celebrations welcoming the French brides of James V, Madeleine of Valois in 1537 and Mary of Guise in 1538.

Lyndsay signed the only surviving letter from this time as "Dauid Lyndsay harauld to our sowerain Lord". His handwriting shows no trace of the italic forms used by those Scots who had finished their education abroad.

After the death of James V, in 1542, Lyndsay continued to sit in Parliament of Scotland as commissioner for Cupar, Fife. In 1548, he was member of a mission to Denmark which obtained certain privileges for Scottish merchants. There is reason to believe that he died in or about 1555. An copy of the inventory of his goods, recorded in the Register of Deeds, dates from 1557.

== Heraldic works ==
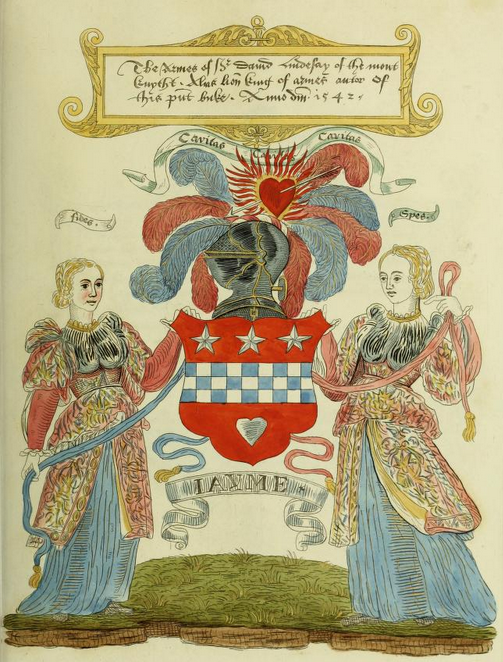
Lyndsay's coat of arms, as illustrated in the Lindsay of the Mount Roll

In 1542, he produced a Scottish roll of arms known today as the Lindsay of the Mount Roll. It contains 400 Scottish coats of arms, some of which were added later in the 16th century, and forms the basis of the official Scots heraldic registry in use today. A facsimile comprising accurate redrawing of his own drawings was published in Edinburgh in 1878.

== Literary works ==
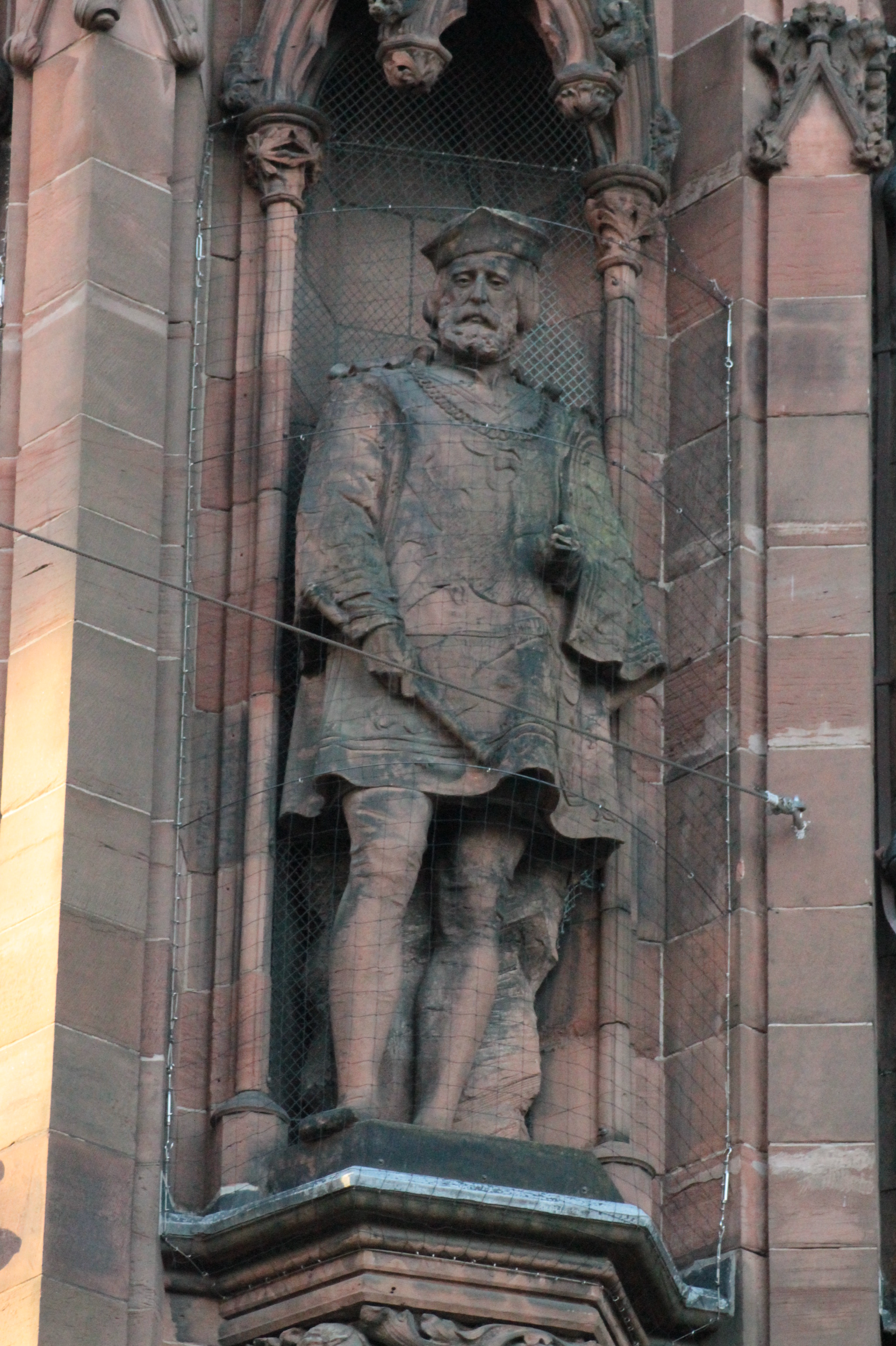
Statue of Sir David Lyndsay, Scottish National Portrait Gallery

Most of Lyndsay's literary work, by which he secured great reputation in his own day and by which he still lives, was written during the period of prosperity at court. In this respect he is different from Gavin Douglas, who abandoned literature to become a politician. The difference is due partly to the fact that Lyndsay's muse was more occasional and satirical, and that the time was suitable to the exercise of his special gifts. It is more difficult to explain how he enjoyed such unparalleled freedom of speech. He chastised all classes, from his royal master to the most simple. There is no evidence that he abjured Catholicism; yet his leading purpose was the exposure of its errors and abuses. His aid was readily accepted by the reforming party, and by their use of his work he shared with their leaders throughout many generations.

Lyndsay, the Makar, is not behind his fellow-poets in acknowledgment to Geoffrey Chaucer. As piously as they, he reproduces the master's forms; but in him the sentiment and outlook have suffered change. His nearest approach to Chaucer is in The Historie and Testament of Squyer Meldrum, which recalls the sketch of the "young squire"; but the reminiscence is verbal rather than spiritual. Elsewhere his memory serves him less happily, as when he describes the array of the lamented Queen Magdalene in the words which Chaucer had applied to the eyes of his wanton Friar. So too, in the Dreme, the allegorical tradition survives only in the form. "Remembrance" conducts the poet over the old-world itinerary, but only to lead him to speculation on Scotland's woes and to an "Exhortatioun to the Kingis Grace" to bring relief. The tenor is well expressed in the motto from the Vulgate – "Prophetias nolite spernere. Omnia autem probate: quod bonum est tenete."

His long poem Ane Dialog betwixt Experience and ane Courteor (sometimes called the Monarchie), a universal history of the medieval type, is also a didactic work. Descriptions of the falls of princes by corruption acted as a lesson to the unreformed church of his day. Ane Pleasant Satyre of the Thrie Estaitis is more direct in its attack on ecclesiastical abuse and takes a more dramatic form and lively tone. This piece is of historical interest as the only extant example of a complete Scottish morality play. In respect of literary quality, some consider it Lyndsay's best work, with its dramatic construction and delineation of character. The farcical interludes, which may be perceived as coarse for modern taste, supply many moments of comedy. Throughout the play there are passages, as in the speeches of Veritie in the First Part and of Dame Chastitie in the "Interlude of the Sowtar and the Taylor," in which word and line are happily conceived.

The Testament of the Papyngo (parrot), drawn in the familiar medieval manner, is another tract for the time, full of admonition to court and clergy. Of his shorter pieces, The Complaynt and Publict Confessions of the Kingis Auld Hound, callit Bagsche, directit to Bawtie, the Kingis best belovit Dog, and his companyconis, and the Answer to the Kingis Flyting have a like pulpit resonance. The former is interesting as a forerunner of Burns's device in the "Twa Dogs". The Answer to the Kingis Flyting describes to the king's amorous adventures before his marriage, and some critics have suggested that the line "Wald God, the lady luffit yow best" refers to Margaret Erskine.

The Deploratioun of the Death of Queen Magdalene is in the extravagant style of commemoration illustrated in Dunbar's Elegy on the Lord Aubigny. The Justing betwix James Watsoun and Jhone Barbour is a contribution to the popular taste for boisterous fun, in spirit, if not in form, akin to the Christis Kirk on the Grene series; and indirectly, with Dunbar's Turnament and Of ane Blak-Moir, a burlesque of the courtly tourney. Lyndsay approaches Dunbar in his satire The Supplicatioun in contemptioun of syde taillis ("wide" trains of the ladies), which recalls the older poet's realistic lines on the filthy condition of the city streets. In Lyndsay's Descriptioun of Pedder Coffeis (pedlars) we have an early example of the studies in vulgar life which are so plentiful in later Scottish literature. In Kitteis Confessioun he returns, but in more sprightly mood, to his attack on the church.

== Critical literature ==
A complete edition of Lyndsay's poetical works was published by David Laing in 3 vols. in 1879. The E.E.T.S. issued the first part of a complete edition in 1865 (ed. F. Hall). Five parts have appeared, four edited by F. Hall, the fifth by J.A.H. Murray. For the bibliography see Laing's 3 vol. edition, u.s. iii. pp. 222 et seq., and the E.E.T.S. edition passim. The Association for Scottish Literary Studies issued Janet Hadley Williams, David Lyndsay, Selected Poems, (2000) freshly establishing texts with detailed notes. See also the editions by Pinkerton (1792), Sibbald (1803), and George Chalmers (1806); and the critical accounts in Henderson's Scottish Vernacular Literature (1898), Gregory Smith's Transition Period (1900), and J.H. Millar's Literary History of Scotland (1903).

A professional work prepared by Lyndsay in the Lyon Office, entitled the Register of Scottish Arms (now preserved in manuscript in the Advocates' Library), was printed in 1821 and reprinted in 1878. It remains the most authoritative document on Scottish heraldry. The Rothesay Herald offered to show the Armorial to the English diplomat Thomas Randolph in October 1561, "wherein are all the arms of all the noblemen and barons both new and old that are in Scotland."

== Diplomatic duties ==
=== Mission of June 1531 ===
As Snowdon Herald, Lyndsay was sent to the Emperor Charles V at the end of June 1531. He was to conclude their Treaty of Perpetual Peace for a duration of 100 years. This would succeed a treaty made 100 years previously. Other business included the long-standing issue of Robert Barton of Over Barnton's ship the Black Bark, seized by Spanish pirates off England in 1519.

In his Latin letters to Charles V, James V refers to Lyndsay as "chief herald" or "first of our order." Lyndsay stayed 7 weeks at court with the Emperor and Queen of Hungary at Brussels.

=== Mission of March 1532 ===
Lyndsay was set to go to France as a herald accompanying Thomas Erskine of Haltoun and the Bishop of Ross in January 1532. This Scottish embassy was delayed till March 1532. The ambassadors were to contract with Francis I of France the marriage of James V to Madeleine of Valois.

=== England 1535 ===
Lyndsay as Lion King of Arms accompanied Lord Erskine with Robert Hart, Rothesay Herald, to Windsor Castle, where they acted as proxy for the installation of James V as a Knight of the Order of the Garter. After travelling to meet Henry VIII at Thornbury Castle, they returned to London, where a servant of Thomas Cromwell gave Lindsay £20.

=== Edinburgh 1540 ===
Lyndsay conducted the visit of the English ambassador Ralph Sadler at Holyroodhouse in February 1540 with his assistant Rothesay Herald. They met Sadler, and brought him to James V at the Chapel Royal in the Palace then returned him to his lodgings and dined with him. Later, Lindsay arranged Sadler's meeting with Margaret Tudor, and brought him to meet her again in Chapel on the following Sunday.

=== England 1543 ===
After the death of James V, Lyndsay was sent by Regent Arran to England to return the late king's collar, garter, and statutes of the Order of the Garter to Stephen Gardiner, Bishop of Winchester, the prelate of the Order. Henry VIII wrote to Arran that Lindsay had fulfilled his office "right discreetly."

=== St Andrews Castle 1546 ===
Lyndsay negotiated with the Protestant lairds of Fife who held St Andrews Castle in December 1546.

=== Denmark 1548 ===
Lyndsay went to discuss shipping issues and possible support during the war now known as the Rough Wooing.

== Longer poems ==
- The Dreme (1134 lines)
- The Testament and Complaynt of the Papyngo (1190 lines)
- The Historie and Testament of Squyer Meldrum (1848 lines)
- Ane Dialog betwix Experience and ane Courteour of the Miserabyll Estait of the World (6333 lines)
- Ane Pleasant Satyre of the Thrie Estaitis (over 4000 lines).

== Other literature ==
Lyndsay of the Mount appears as the sympathetic major character in Nigel Tranter's well-researched James V trilogy: The Riven Realm (1984), James by the Grace of God (1985), and Rough Wooing (1987).

Lyndsay's description of the Tower of Babel in his Dialog ("The shadow of that hyddeous strength [the Tower of Babel], sax myle and more it is of length") is used as the motto of the novel That Hideous Strength by C. S. Lewis, and the book's name is also derived from it.

Lyndsay appears as a character in Sir Walter Scott's epic poem Marmion. He is depicted amongst the sixteen Scottish writers and poets on the lower section of the Scott Monument on Princes Street in Edinburgh. He is shown on the left side of the southern face.

Lyndsay of the Mount is a major character in John Arden's play Armstrong's Last Goodnight set in 16th-century Scotland.

== Arms ==
Coat of arms of Sir David Lyndsay of the Mount
Escutcheon Gules a fess chequy argent and azure between in chief three stars and in base a man's heart argent.

== See also ==
- Scottish literature

== External links and editions ==
- Works of David Lindsay, Edinburgh (1776)
- Pinkerton, John, Scottish Poems: Lindsay's Eight interludes from the Bannatyne Manuscript, vol.2, London (1792)
- Chalmers, George, ed., The poetical works of Sir David Lyndsay of the Mount: Lion king at arms, under James V, vol.1, London (1806)
- Chalmers, George, ed., The poetical works of Sir David Lyndsay of the Mount: Lion king at arms, under James V, vol.2, London (1806)
- Chalmers, George, ed., The poetical works of Sir David Lyndsay of the Mount: Lion king at arms, under James V, vol.3, London (1806)
- Laing, David, ed., Poetical Works of David Lyndsay, vol.1, Edinburgh (1879)
- Laing, David, ed., Poetical Works of David Lyndsay, vol.2, Edinburgh (1879)
- Laing, David, ed., Poetical Works of David Lyndsay, vol.3, Edinburgh (1879)
- Full text of The Dreme in Scottish Poetry of the Sixteenth Century at archive.org

=== Early English Text Society edition ===
- Hall, Fitzedward, ed., Ane Satyre of the Thrie Estaits, (1602), Trübner / EETS
- Murray, J.A.H., ed., The Minor Poems of Lyndesay, Trübner / EETS (1871)
- Hall, Fitzedward, ed., Historie and Testament of Meldrum, Trübner / EETS (1868)
