= Spartak =

Spartak is the name of Spartacus in many Slavic languages and languages of other post-Soviet states. It may refer to:

== In sports ==
- Spartak (sports society), an international fitness and sports society that unites some countries of the former Soviet Union

=== In Russia ===
- FC Spartak Moscow, a football club
- FC Spartak Kostroma, a football club
- PFC Spartak Nalchik, a football club
- FC Spartak Vladikavkaz, a football club
- FC Spartak Shchyolkovo, a football club
- FC Spartak Nizhny Novgorod, a football club
- HC Spartak Moscow, an ice hockey team
- Spartak Saint Petersburg, a basketball team
- Spartak Tennis Club, a tennis training facility
- WBC Spartak Moscow, a women's basketball team

=== In Ukraine ===
- Spartak (Ukraine), a physical culture and multi-sport club
- Spartak Ivano-Frankivsk, a football team
- FC Spartak Sumy, a football club
- Zakarpattia Uzhhorod, a football club, formerly known as Spartak Uzhhorod

=== In Bulgaria ===
- PFC Spartak Varna, a football team
- PFC Spartak Pleven, a football team
- FC Spartak Plovdiv, a football team
- Spartak Sofia, a former football team
- BC Spartak Pleven, a basketball team
- BC Spartak Sofia, a former basketball team

=== In Serbia ===
- FK Spartak Ljig, a football club
- FK Spartak Subotica, a football team
- FK Radnički (disambiguation), several teams

=== In Slovakia ===
- FC Spartak Trnava, a football team
- FC Spartak Trnava Women, a women’s football team
- TJ Spartak Myjava, a football team
- FK Spartak Vráble, a football team
- FK Spartak Bánovce nad Bebravou, a football team

=== In other countries ===
- Spartak Stadium (disambiguation)
- FC Spartak Semey, a Kazakh football team
- SK Spartak Příbram, a Czech football team
- Spartak Helsinki, a football club from Finland
- Spartak (Cape Verde), a Cape Verdean football team
- Barnt Green Spartak F.C., the former name of English football team Birmingham United
- Bristol Spartak F.C., an English football team
- Budapesti Spartacus, a Hungarian sports club
- Spartak Gringley, a consistently successful fantasy football team, particularly in The Golden Boot Game
- Spartak FC founded 1994 and one time member of BP Berkhamstead Sunday League playing in Div 6, Divisional Cup runners up 1999.

== Places ==
- Spartak, Yasynuvata Raion, a village in Donetsk Oblast
- Spartak, Kyrgyzstan, a village in Chuy Province, Kyrgyzstan

== Other uses ==
- Spartak (given name)
- Spartak (Moscow Metro), a station of Moscow Metro
- Spartacus (ballet), by Aram Khachaturian

== See also ==
- Sparta (disambiguation)
- Spartacus (disambiguation)
