= Spartacus =

Thracian gladiator who led a slave revolt (c. 103 – 71 BC)

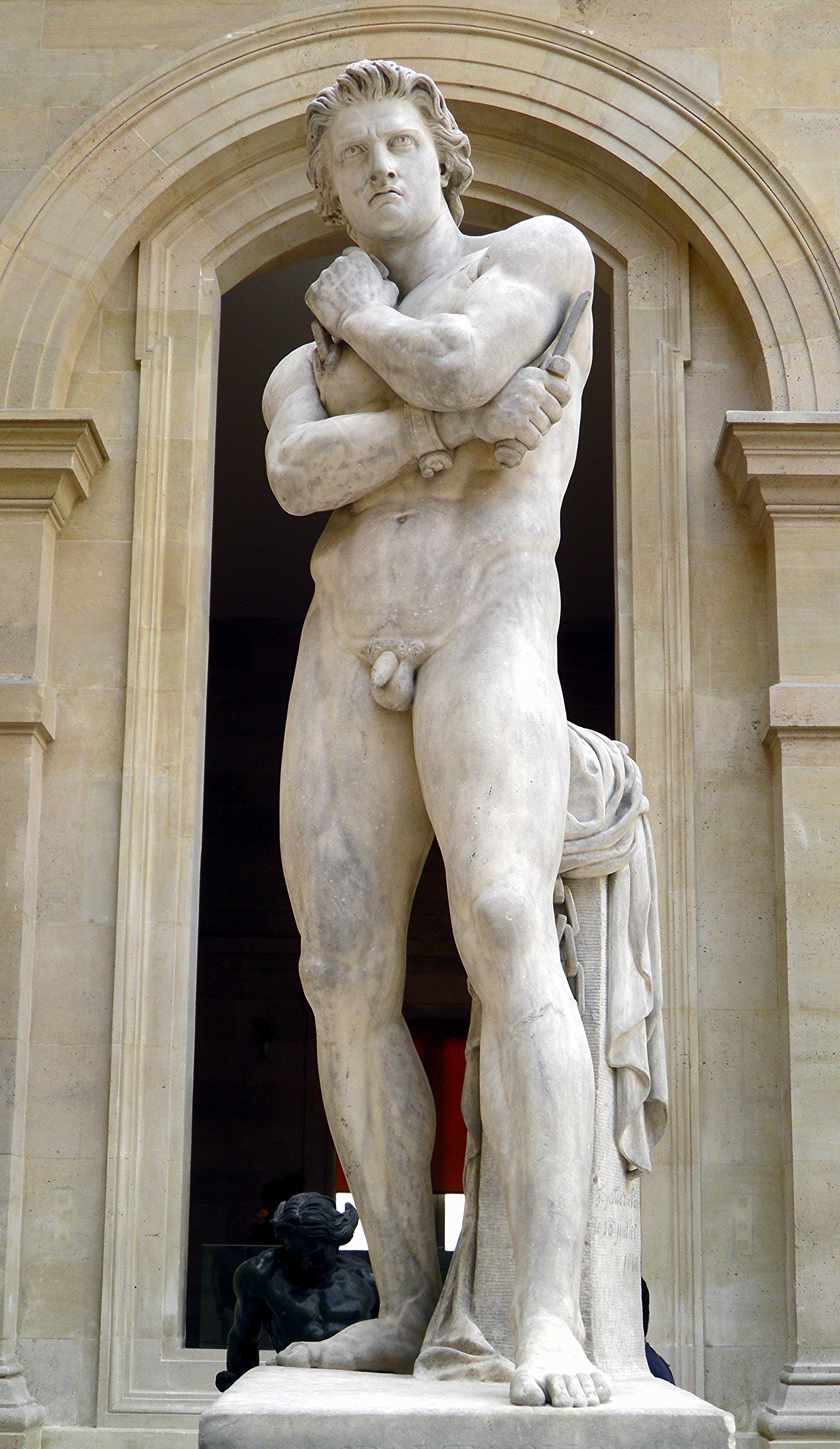
- Statue depicting Spartacus by Denis Foyatier (1830)
- Born: c. 103 BC; Near the Strymon river in present-day Bulgaria
- Died: 71 BC (aged 32); Near the Sele river in Lucania, Roman Italy
- Military career
- Service years: 73–71 BC
- Commands: Rebel slave army
- Conflicts: Third Servile War

Spartacus (Note: Ancient Greek: Σπάρτακος, romanized: Spártakos; Latin: Spartacus) (/ˈspɑːrtəkəs/; c. 103 – 71 BC) was a Thracian gladiator who was one of the escaped slave leaders in the Third Servile War, a major slave uprising against the Roman Republic.

Historical accounts of his life come primarily from Plutarch and Appian, who wrote more than a century after his death. Plutarch's Life of Crassus and Appian's Civil Wars provide the most detailed accounts of the slave revolt. Although Spartacus is a significant figure in Roman history, no contemporary sources exist, and all accounts are written significantly later, by persons not directly involved, and without perspectives of slaves or eyewitnesses. Little is known about him beyond the events of the war, and the extant accounts are contradictory. All sources agree, however, that he was a former gladiator and accomplished military leader.

Spartacus is described as having been born near the Strymon river, in Thrace (now known as Bulgaria), possibly from the Maedi tribe. Before his enslavement and use as a gladiator, he served as a soldier with the Romans. His revolt began in 73 BC when, along with about 70 other gladiators, he escaped a gladiatorial school near Capua. Despite their initially small numbers, Spartacus's forces were able to defeat several Roman military units and swell their ranks to an estimated 70,000 enslaved people and others. Spartacus proved himself a capable tactician despite the dearth of formal military training among his followers, who were a diverse mix.

The rebellion posed a significant challenge to Roman authority, prompting a series of military campaigns against it. Ultimately, Marcus Licinius Crassus was tasked with suppressing the revolt. Despite initial successes and attempts to negotiate and escape to Sicily, Spartacus's forces were defeated in 71 BC. Spartacus was presumed killed in the final battle, although his body was never found. In the aftermath of the rebellion, 6,000 captured rebels were crucified along the Appian Way.

Spartacus's motives remain a subject of debate. Some sources suggest he aimed to escape Italy, while others hint at broader social reform goals. His legacy has endured, inspiring cultural works and becoming a symbol of resistance and revolutionary movements. The rebellion, interpreted as an example of oppressed people fighting for their freedom against a slave-owning oligarchy, has been portrayed in literature, television, and film. The philosopher Voltaire described the Third Servile War as "the only just war in history". Although this interpretation is not specifically contradicted by classical historians, no historical account claims that the goal was to end slavery in the Republic.

== Sources ==
There are two main sources on Spartacus, both of which were written a century or more after his death: Plutarch of Chaeronea (46 AD - 119 AD) and Appian of Alexandria (95 AD – AD 165). The specific works are Life of Crassus (early Second Century AD) by Plutarch and Civil Wars (early to mid Second Century AD) by Appian. Out of all surviving sources on Spartacus, none was written by eyewitnesses and are all later reconstructions; nor were the sources written by slaves or former slaves, and the earliest source was at least a generation after the war.

== Early life ==
The Greek essayist Plutarch describes Spartacus as "a Thracian of Nomadic stock", in a possible reference to the Maedi tribe. Appian says he was "a Thracian by birth, who had once served as a soldier with the Romans, but had since been a prisoner and sold for a gladiator".

Florus described him as one "who, from a Thracian mercenary, had become a Roman soldier, that had deserted and became enslaved, and afterward, from consideration of his strength, a gladiator". The authors refer to the Thracian tribe of the Maedi, which occupied the area on the southwestern fringes of Thrace, along its border with the Roman province of Macedonia, in what is now south-western Bulgaria. Plutarch also writes that Spartacus's wife, a prophetess of the Maedi tribe, was enslaved with him.

The name Spartacus is otherwise manifested in the Black Sea region. Five out of twenty kings of the Thracian Spartocid dynasty of the Cimmerian Bosporus and Pontus are known to have borne the name, and a Thracian "Sparta" "Spardacus" or "Sparadokos", father of Seuthes I of the Odrysae, is also known.

One modern author estimates that Spartacus was c. 30 years old at the time he started his revolt, which would place his birth year c. 103 BC.

== Enslavement and escape ==
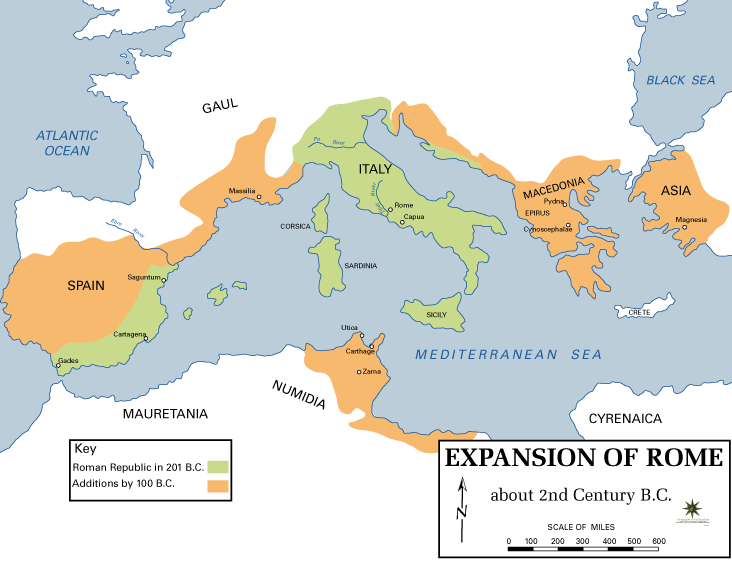
The extent of the Roman Republic at 100 BC.

According to the differing sources and their interpretation, Spartacus was a captive taken by the legions. Spartacus was trained at the gladiatorial school (ludus) near Capua belonging to Lentulus Batiatus. He was a heavyweight gladiator called a murmillo. These fighters carried a large oblong shield (scutum), and used a sword with a broad, straight blade (gladius), about 18 inches long. In 73 BC, Spartacus was among a group of gladiators plotting an escape.

About 70 slaves were part of the plot. Though few in number, they seized kitchen utensils, fought their way free from the school, and seized several wagons of gladiatorial weapons and armour. The escaped slaves defeated soldiers sent after them, plundered the region surrounding Capua, recruited many other slaves into their ranks, and eventually retired to a more defensible position on Mount Vesuvius.

Once free, the escaped gladiators chose Spartacus and two Gallic slaves—Crixus and Oenomaus—as their leaders. Although Roman authors assumed that the escaped slaves were a homogeneous group with Spartacus as their leader, they may have projected their own hierarchical view of military leadership onto the spontaneous organization, reducing other slave leaders to subordinate positions in their accounts.

== Third Servile War ==
The response of the Romans was hampered by the absence of the Roman legions, which were engaged in fighting a revolt in Hispania and the Third Mithridatic War. Furthermore, the Romans considered the rebellion more of a policing matter than a war. Rome dispatched militia under the command of the praetor Gaius Claudius Glaber, who besieged Spartacus and his camp on Mount Vesuvius, hoping that starvation would force Spartacus to surrender. They were taken by surprise when Spartacus used ropes made from vines to climb down the steep side of the volcano with his men and attacked the unfortified Roman camp in the rear, killing most of the militia.

The rebels also defeated a second expedition against them, nearly capturing the praetor commander, killing his lieutenants, and seizing the military equipment. Due to these successes, more and more slaves flocked to the Spartacan forces, as did many of the herdsmen and shepherds of the region, swelling their ranks to some 70,000. At its height, Spartacus's army included many different peoples, including Celts, Gauls, and others. Due to the previous Social War (91–87 BC), some of Spartacus's ranks were legion veterans. Of the slaves that joined Spartacus ranks, many were from the countryside. Rural slaves lived a life that better prepared them to fight in Spartacus's army. In contrast, urban slaves were more used to city life and were considered "privileged" and "lazy."

In these altercations, Spartacus proved to be an excellent tactician, suggesting that he may have had previous military experience. Though the rebels lacked military training, they displayed skilful use of available local materials and unusual tactics against the disciplined Roman armies. They spent the winter of 73–72 BC training, arming and equipping their new recruits, and expanding their raiding territory to include the towns of Nola, Nuceria, Thurii, and Metapontum. The distance between these locations and the subsequent events indicate that the slaves operated in two groups commanded by Spartacus and Crixus.

In the spring of 72 BC, the rebels left their winter encampments and began to move northward. At the same time, the Roman Senate, alarmed by the defeat of the praetorian forces, dispatched a pair of consular legions under the command of Lucius Gellius and Gnaeus Cornelius Lentulus Clodianus. The two legions were initially successful—defeating a group of 30,000 rebels commanded by Crixus near Mount Garganus—but then were defeated by Spartacus. These defeats are depicted in divergent ways by the two most comprehensive (extant) histories of the war by Appian and Plutarch.

Alarmed at the continued threat posed by the slaves, the Senate charged Marcus Licinius Crassus, the wealthiest man in Rome and the only volunteer for the position, with ending the rebellion. Crassus was put in charge of eight legions, numbering upwards of 40,000 trained Roman soldiers; he treated these with harsh discipline, reviving the punishment of "decimation", in which one-tenth of his men were slain to make them more afraid of him than their enemy. When Spartacus and his followers, who for unclear reasons had retreated to the south of Italy, moved northward again in early 71 BC, Crassus deployed six of his legions on the borders of the region and detached his legate Mummius with two legions to maneuver behind Spartacus. Though ordered not to engage the rebels, Mummius attacked at a seemingly opportune moment but was routed. After this, Crassus's legions were victorious in several engagements, forcing Spartacus farther south through Lucania as Crassus gained the upper hand. By the end of 71 BC, Spartacus was encamped in Rhegium (Reggio Calabria), near the Strait of Messina.

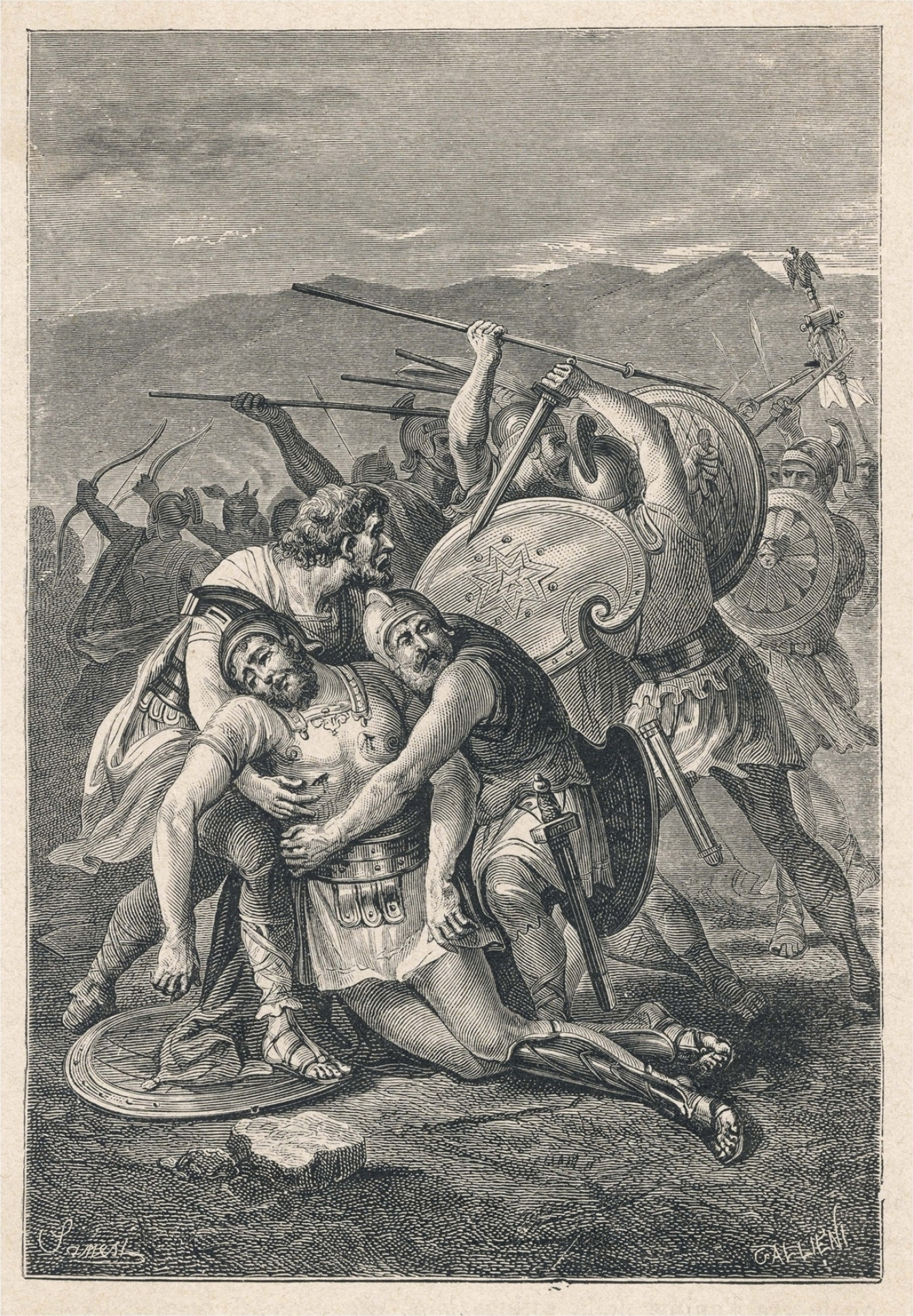
A 19th-century depiction of the fall of Spartacus by the Italian Nicola Sanesi (1818–1889)

According to Plutarch, Spartacus made a bargain with Cilician pirates to transport him and some 2,000 of his men to Sicily, where he intended to incite a slave revolt and gather reinforcements. However, he was betrayed by the pirates, who took payment and then abandoned the rebels. Minor sources mention that there were some attempts at raft and shipbuilding by the rebels as a means to escape, but that Crassus took unspecified measures to ensure the rebels could not cross to Sicily, and their efforts were abandoned. Spartacus's forces then retreated toward Rhegium. Crassus's legions followed and upon arrival built fortifications across the isthmus at Rhegium, despite harassing raids from the rebels. The rebels were now under siege and cut off from their supplies.

At this time, the legions of Pompey returned from Hispania and were ordered by the Senate to head south to aid Crassus. Crassus feared that Pompey's involvement would deprive him of credit for defeating Spartacus himself. Hearing of Pompey's involvement, Spartacus tried to make a truce with Crassus. When Crassus refused, Spartacus and his army broke through the Roman fortifications and headed to Brundusium with Crassus's legions in pursuit.

When the legions managed to catch a portion of the rebels separated from the main army, discipline among Spartacus's forces broke down as small groups independently attacked the oncoming legions. Spartacus now turned his forces around and brought his entire strength to bear on the legions in a last stand, in which the rebels were routed completely, with the vast majority of them being killed on the battlefield.

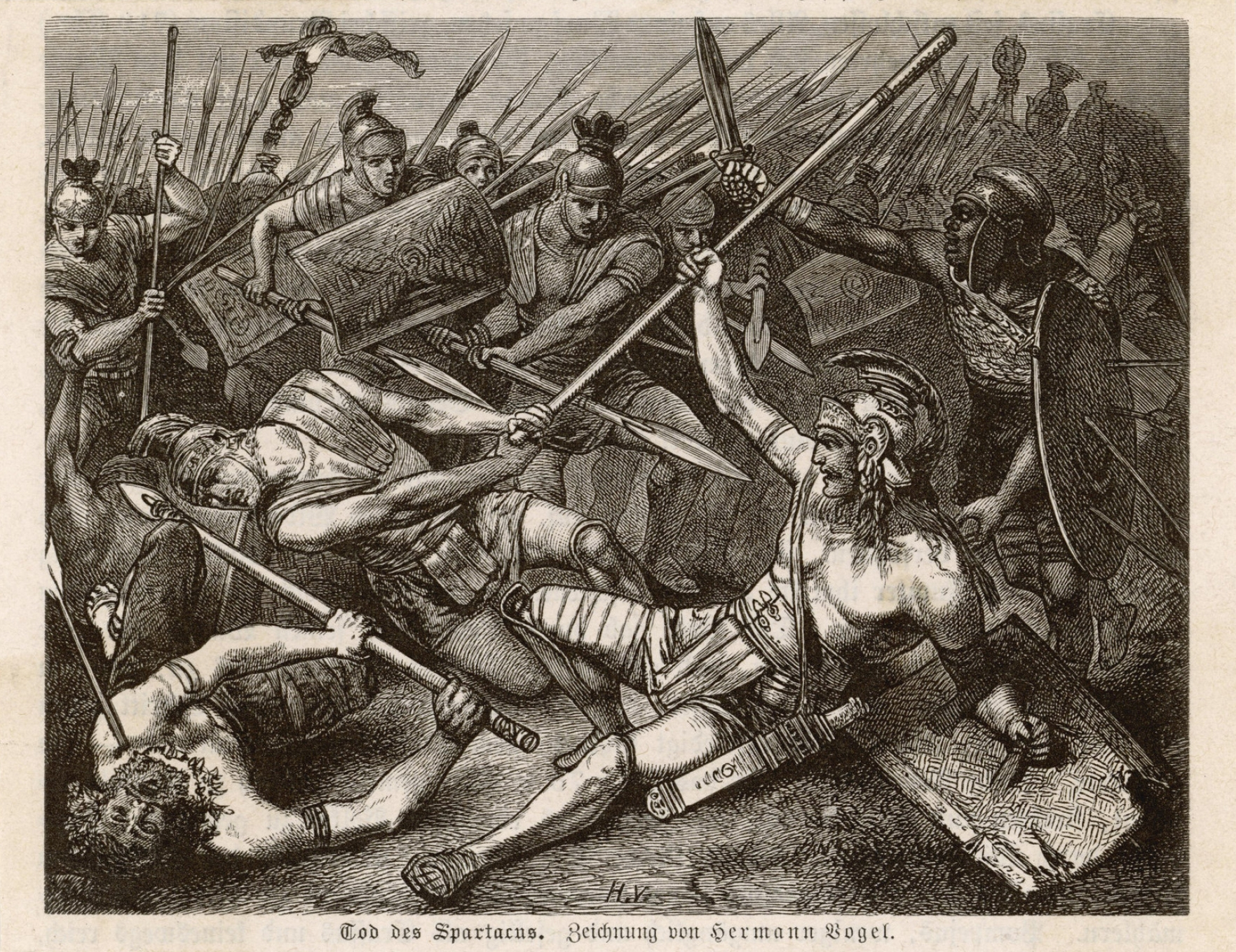
The Death of Spartacus by Hermann Vogel (1882)

The final battle that saw the assumed defeat of Spartacus in 71 BC took place on the present territory of Senerchia on the right bank of the river Sele in the area that includes the border with Oliveto Citra up to those of Calabritto, near the village of Quaglietta, in the High Sele Valley, which at that time was part of Lucania. In this area, since 1899, there have been finds of armour and swords of the Roman era.

Plutarch, Appian, and Florus all claim that Spartacus died during the battle, but Appian also reports that his body was never found. Six thousand survivors of the revolt captured by the legions of Crassus were crucified, lining the Appian Way from Rome to Capua, a distance of more than 100 miles.

== Objectives ==
Classical historians were divided as to the motives of Spartacus. None of Spartacus's actions overtly suggest that he aimed at reforming Roman society or abolishing slavery.

Plutarch writes that Spartacus wished to escape north into Cisalpine Gaul and disperse his men back to their homes. If escaping the Italian peninsula was indeed his goal, it is not clear why Spartacus turned south after defeating the legions commanded by the consuls Lucius Publicola and Gnaeus Clodianus, which left his force a clear passage over the Alps.

Appian and Florus write that he intended to march on Rome itself. Appian also states that he later abandoned that goal, which might have been no more than a reflection of Roman fears.

Based on the events in late 73 BC and early 72 BC, which suggest independently operating groups of escaped slaves and a statement by Plutarch, it appears that some of the escaped slaves preferred to plunder Italy, rather than escape over the Alps.

== Legacy and recognition ==
Toussaint Louverture, a leader of the slave revolt that led to the independence of Haiti, has been called the "Black Spartacus".

Adam Weishaupt, founder of the Bavarian Illuminati, often referred to himself as Spartacus within written correspondences.

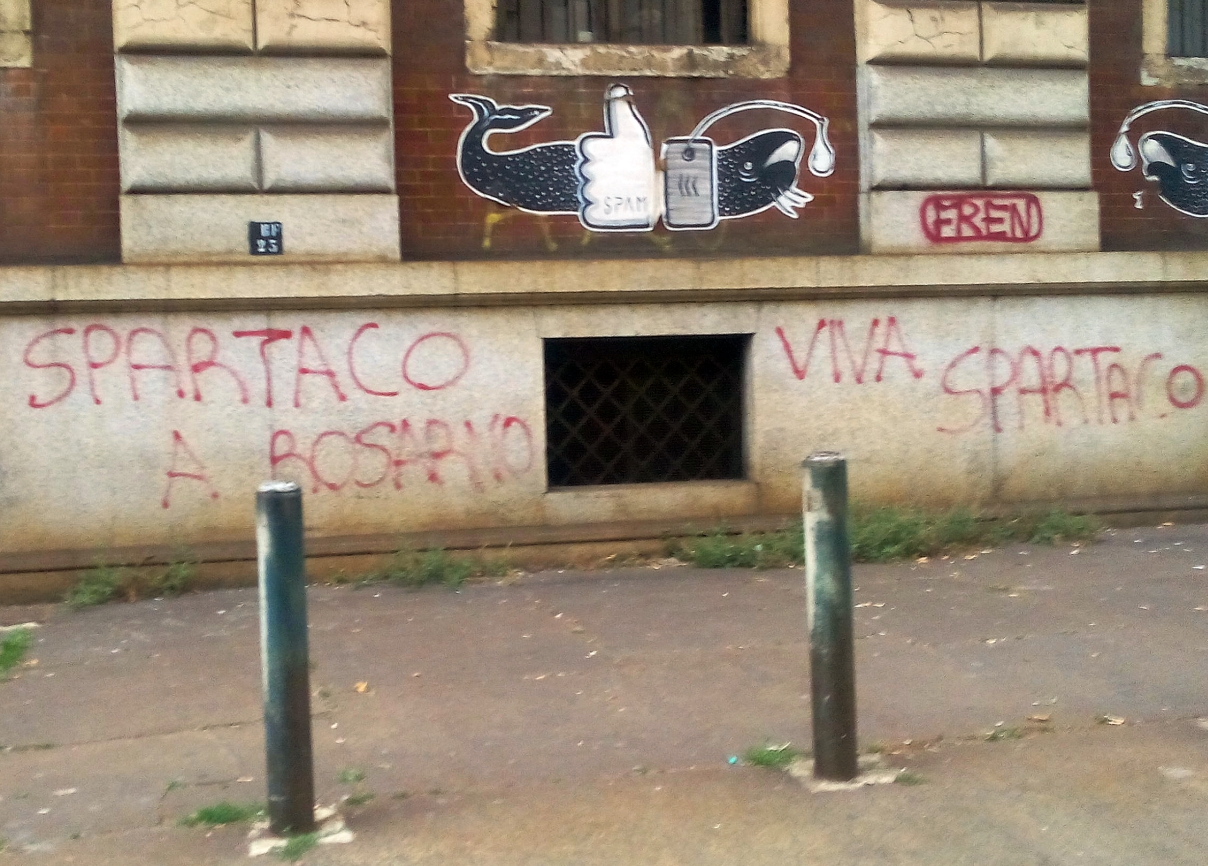
Viva Spartaco, Spartaco a Rosarno: graffiti connecting Spartacus with 2010 Rosarno riots between locals and migrant farm workers

In modern times, Spartacus became a hero and icon for communists and socialists. Karl Marx listed Spartacus as one of his heroes and described him as "the most splendid fellow in the whole of ancient history" and a "great general, noble character, real representative of the ancient proletariat". Spartacus has been a great inspiration to left-wing revolutionaries, most notably the German Spartacus League (1915–18), a forerunner of the Communist Party of Germany. A January 1919 uprising by communists in Germany was called the Spartacist uprising. Spartacus Books, one of the longest running collectively-run leftist book stores in North America, is also named in his honour. The village of Spartak, in Donetsk Oblast, Ukraine, is also named after Spartacus.

Spartacus's name was also used in athletics in the Soviet Union and communist states of Central and Eastern Europe. The Spartakiad was a Soviet bloc version of the Olympic games. This name was also used for the mass gymnastics exhibition held every five years in Czechoslovakia. The mascot for the Ottawa Senators, Spartacat, is also named after him.

== In popular culture ==
=== Film ===
- The 1953 film Sins of Rome, directed by Riccardo Freda.
- The 1960 film Spartacus, directed by Stanley Kubrick, was executive-produced by and starred Kirk Douglas, and was based on Howard Fast's novel Spartacus.
- The 1964 film Spartacus and the Ten Gladiators, directed by Nick Nostro.

=== Television ===
- Fast's novel was adapted as a 2004 miniseries, with Goran Višnjić in the main role.
- An episode of 2007–08 BBC's docudrama Heroes and Villains features Spartacus.
- The television series Spartacus, starring Andy Whitfield and later Liam McIntyre in the title role, aired from 2010 to 2013.
- The History Channel's Barbarians Rising (2016) features the story of Spartacus in its second episode entitled "Rebellion".
- Spartacus appears in the season 6 premiere of DC's Legends of Tomorrow, portrayed by Shawn Roberts.

=== Literature ===
- Howard Fast wrote the historical novel Spartacus, the basis of the 1960 film of the same name.
- Arthur Koestler wrote a novel about Spartacus called The Gladiators.
- The Scottish writer Lewis Grassic Gibbon wrote a novel Spartacus.
- The Italian writer Raffaello Giovagnoli wrote his historical novel, Spartacus, in 1874. His novel has been translated and published in many European countries.
- The German writer Bertolt Brecht wrote Spartacus, his second play, before 1920. It was later renamed Drums in the Night.
- The Latvian writer Andrejs Upīts in 1943 wrote the play Spartacus.
- The Polish writer Halina Rudnicka in 1951 wrote a novel Uczniowie Spartakusa (Spartacus's disciples).
- The Reverend Elijah Kellogg's Spartacus to the Gladiators at Capua has been used by school pupils to practice their oratory skills.
- Amal Donkol, the Egyptian modern poet wrote "The Last Words of Spartacus".
- Max Gallo wrote the novel Les Romains: Spartacus, la révolte des esclaves, 2006.
- Ben Kane wrote the novels Spartacus: The Gladiator and Spartacus: Rebellion, in 2012.

=== Theater ===
- The 1831 play The Gladiator, written by Robert Montgomery Bird.
- The 1956 ballet Spartacus, whose score was by Soviet Armenian composer Aram Khachaturian.

=== Radio play ===
- The 1942 radio play Spartacus by Dymphna Cusack.

=== Music ===
- The "Spartacus Overture" was written by composer Camille Saint-Saëns in 1863.
- "Love Theme From Spartacus" was a hit for composer Alex North and has become a jazz standard.
- In 1975 Triumvirat released Spartacus, a classic "prog rock" album.
- Phantom Regiment's show, "Spartacus", was the championship show of the 2008 Drum Corps International season.
- Jeff Wayne released his musical retelling, Jeff Wayne's Musical Version of Spartacus, in 1992.

=== Places ===
- Spartacus Peak on Livingston Island in the South Shetland Islands.

=== In sports ===
Several sports clubs, in particular in the former Communist Bloc, were named after the Roman gladiator.

==== In Russia ====
- FC Spartak Moscow, a football club
- FC Spartak Kostroma, a football club
- PFC Spartak Nalchik, a football club
- FC Spartak Vladikavkaz, a football club
- HC Spartak Moscow, an ice hockey team
- Spartak Saint Petersburg, a basketball team
- Spartak Tennis Club, a tennis training facility
- WBC Spartak Moscow, a women's basketball team

==== In Ukraine ====
- FC Spartak Sumy, a football club
- Spartak Ivano-Frankivsk, a football team
- Zakarpattia Uzhhorod, a football club, formerly known as Spartak Uzhhorod

==== In Bulgaria ====
- FC Spartak Varna, a football team
- OFC Spartak Pleven, a football team
- PFC Spartak Plovdiv, a football team
- Spartak Sofia, a defunct football team

==== In Serbia ====
- FK Spartak Subotica, a football team
- FK Radnički, several teams

==== In Slovakia ====
- FC Spartak Trnava, a football team
- TJ Spartak Myjava, a football team
- FK Spartak Vráble, a football team
- FK Spartak Bánovce nad Bebravou, a football team

==== In other countries ====
- Spartak Stadium (disambiguation)
- Barnt Green Spartak F.C., an English football team
- Spartak (Cape Verde), a Cape Verdean football team
- FC Spartak Semey, a Kazakh football team

== See also ==
- Autaritus – 3rd-century BCE Gallic chieftain and mercenary
- Gaius Julius Civilis – Leader of the Batavian rebellion against the Romans in 69 AD
- John of Gothia – Crimean Gothic metropolitan bishop
- Vercingetorix – Gallic chieftain (c. 82 – 46 BC)
- Viriathus – Lusitanian leader and rebel (d. 139 BCE)

== Bibliography ==
Classical authors

- Appian. Civil Wars. Translated by J. Carter. (Harmondsworth: Penguin Books, 1996)
- Florus. Epitome of Roman History. (London: W. Heinemann, 1947)
- Orosius. The Seven Books of History Against the Pagans. Translated by Roy J. Deferrari. (Washington, DC: Catholic University of America Press, 1964).
- Plutarch. Fall of the Roman Republic. Translated by R. Warner. (London: Penguin Books, 1972), with special emphasis placed on "The Life of Crassus" and "The Life of Pompey".
- Sallust. Conspiracy of Catiline and the War of Jugurtha. (London: Constable, 1924)

Modern historiography

- Bradley, Keith R. Slavery and Rebellion in the Roman World, 140 B.C.–70 B.C. Bloomington; Indianapolis: Indiana University Press, 1989 (hardcover, ISBN 0-253-31259-0); 1998 (paperback, ISBN 0-253-21169-7). [Chapter V] The Slave War of Spartacus, pp. 83–101.
- Rubinsohn, Wolfgang Zeev. Spartacus' Uprising and Soviet Historical Writing. Oxford: Oxbow Books, 1987 (paperback, ISBN 0-9511243-1-5).
- Spartacus: Film and History, edited by Martin M. Winkler. Oxford: Blackwell Publishers, 2007 (hardcover, ISBN 1-4051-3180-2; paperback, ISBN 1-4051-3181-0).
- Trow, M.J. Spartacus: The Myth and the Man. Stroud, United Kingdom: Sutton Publishing, 2006 (hardcover, ISBN 0-7509-3907-9).
- Genner, Michael. "Spartakus. Eine Gegengeschichte des Altertums nach den Legenden der Zigeuner". Two volumes. Paperback. Trikont Verlag, München 1979/1980. Vol 1 ISBN 978-3-88167-053-1 Vol 2 ISBN 978-3-88167-060-9
- Plamen Pavlov, Stanimir Dimitrov,Spartak – sinyt na drenva Trakija/Spartacus – the Son of ancient Thrace. Sofia, 2009, ISBN 978-954-378-024-2
- Strauss, Barry (2009). The Spartacus War. Simon & Schuster. ISBN 978-1-4165-3205-7.
- Beard, Mary. SPQR A History of Ancient Rome. New York: Liveright Publishing Corporation, 2015, ISBN 978-1-63149-222-8
- Harman, Chris. Spartacus and the Slave Revolt that Shook the Roman Empire. London: Redwords, 2024. ISBN 9781917020107
