= Federico Gattorno =

Italian military personnel and politician (1836–1913)

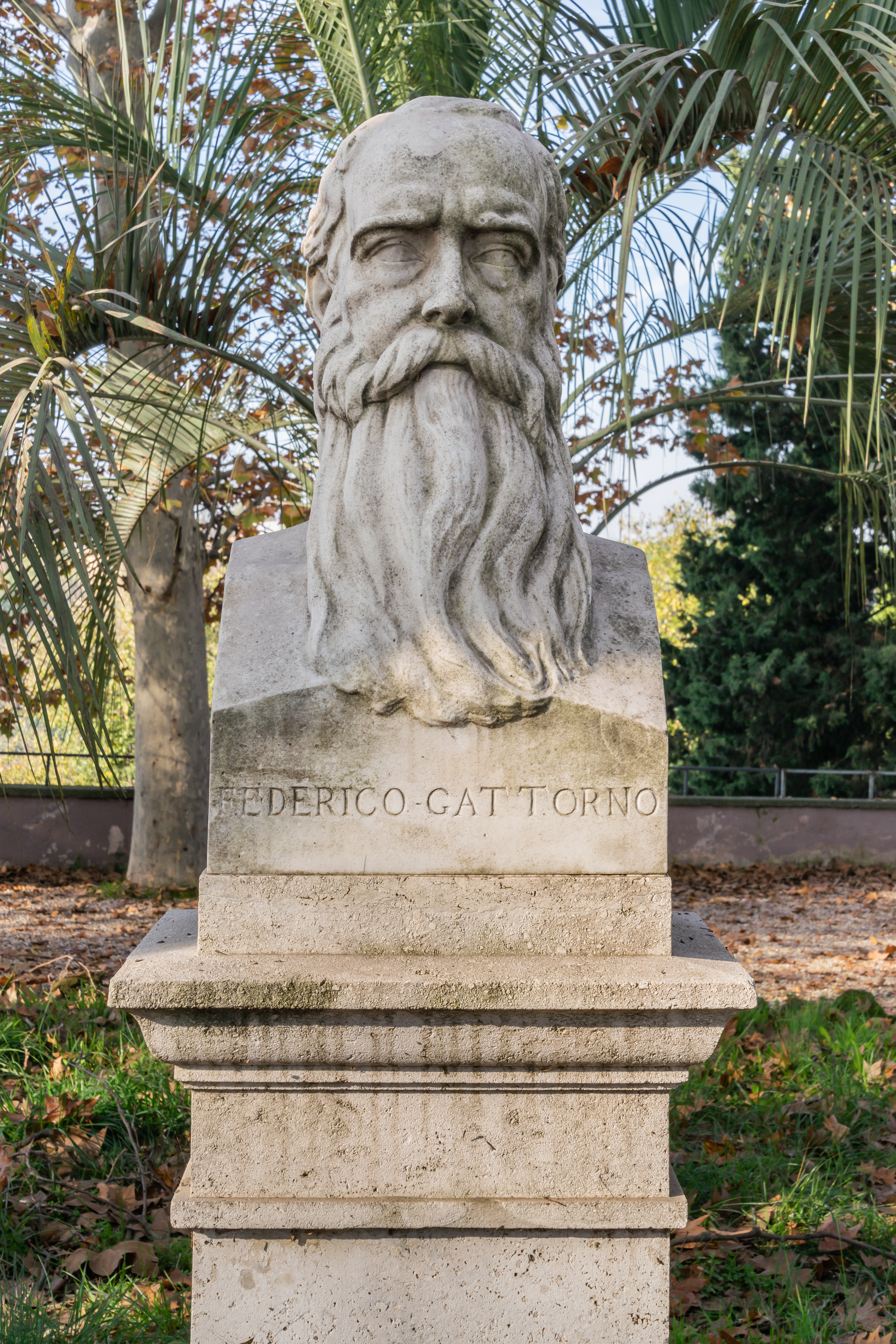

Federico Gattorno (13 January 1836 – 6 May 1913) was an Italian fighter from the Risorgimento and politician.

He was born in Genoa to a family of grain merchants and traveled as a young man to Odessa, Kiev, and Taganrog. In 1849, a young Federico was arrested after participating in a revolt in Genoa. His maternal uncle was Federico Campanella, a dedicated freemason and companion of Giuseppe Mazzini. Traveling in Russia during the start of the Spedizione dei Mille, Federico was able in Istanbul to outfit a company of 150 volunteers, Italian immigrants, that then traveled to Ancona, and joined Garibaldi in Naples. He participated in the Battle of Volturno.

He joined Garibaldian forces in Genoa aiming to overthrow the papal government, but after the defeat at Aspromonte, he was arrested. After further travels through Europe, he fought in the Trentino as a captain with a cohort of Genoese carabinieri. He was again jailed and released in June 1868. On 22 June 1869 he was arrested again this time alongside Antonio Mosto and Stefano Canzio for an insurrection against the king of Savoy. Released, he was again jailed in 1870 during another republican rebellion in Genoa. Released he joined Garibaldian forces fighting alongside the French. He was awarded the Cross of the Legion of Honor by France.

He continued republican agitation from Genoa in protests along with Mosto, Canzio, and Canzio's wife, Teresita Garibaldi (daughter of Giuseppe). His maternal uncle, Federico Campanella, was a committed supporter of Giuseppe Mazzini. Gattorno ran for election in 1882, but lost, and relocated to Rome, continuing to advocate in the mid-1890s onward for republican government along with many others, including Carlo Meyer, Ettore Ferrari, Antonio Fratti, Ernesto Nathan, and Luigi Arnaldo Vassallo. In 1896, he enlisted with some volunteers fighting under the leadership of Ricciotti Garibaldi for the cause of Greece against the Ottomans. In 1897, he was finally elected to congress, a post he would again win in 1900, 1904, and 1909. He was still advocating for a republic. In 1899, he supported the founding of the journal L'Italia and supported the controversial erection of a Monument to Giordano Bruno in Campo de' Fiori.

While Federico was vociferously anti-clerical and anti-papist, his sister Rosa Maria Benedetta Gattorno Custo was founder of the Congregation of Sisters of St Anne, and is presently beatified by the Catholic church.
