= Elijah Kellogg Church =

Historic church in Maine, United States

- U.S. National Register of Historic Places
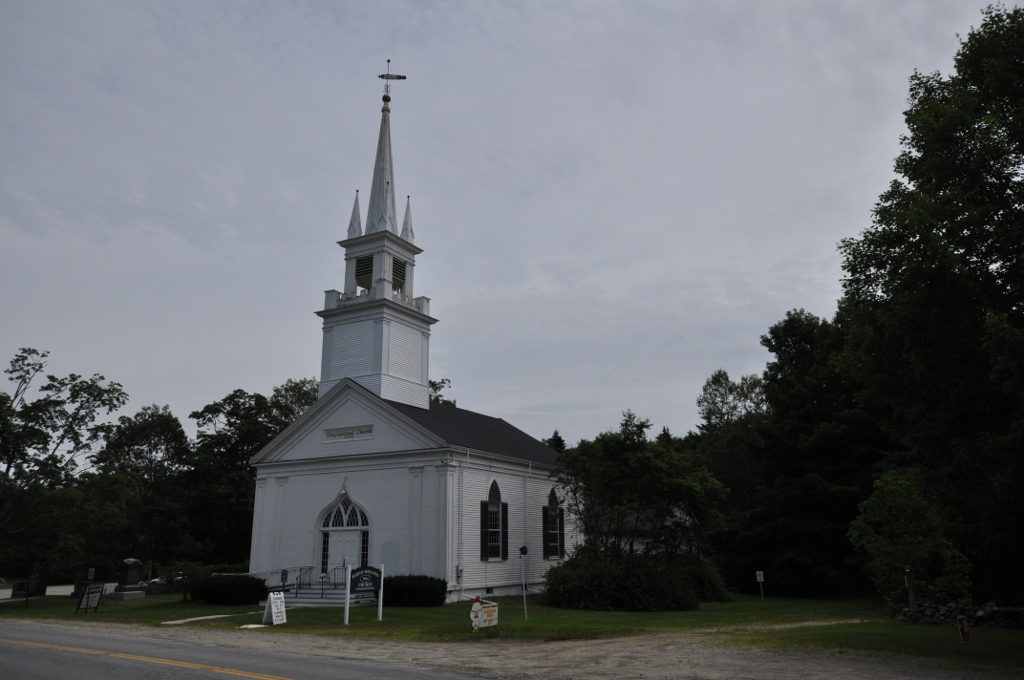

- Location within Maine Location within the United States
- Location: 917 Harpswell Neck Road (ME 123), Harpswell, Maine
- Coordinates: 43°47′59″N 69°59′12″W
- Area: 0.5 acres (0.20 ha)
- Built: 1843
- Architect: Raymond, Anthony Coombs
- Architectural style: Greek Revival, Gothic Revival
- NRHP reference No.: 79000140
- Added to NRHP: June 27, 1979

The Elijah Kellogg Church is a historic Congregationalist church at 917 Harpswell Neck Road (Maine State Route 123) in Harpswell, Maine. Built in 1843, it is a well-preserved example of Greek and Gothic Revival architecture, and is further notable for its longtime association with Rev. Elijah Kellogg, a well-known 19th-century writer of children's books. The church building was listed on the National Register of Historic Places in 1979. The church is affiliated with the National Association of Congregational Christian Churches; its pastor is John Carson.

== Description and history ==
The Elijah Kellogg Church is located in Harpswell Center, on the east side of Harpswell Neck Road, opposite the 1750s Harpswell Meetinghouse. It is a single-story wood-frame structure, with a gable roof, exterior mostly finished in clapboards, and a granite foundation. The roof is capped by a multi-stage tower, whose short first stage is finished in matchboard, with a taller second stage with corner pilasters, and an open square belfry with an entablatured cornice supported by pilastered posts, and a steeple above. The most prominent feature of the main facade is the entrance, which is set in an ogee-carved archway with tracery windows above and flanking the doors. Paired pilasters are set at the building corners, rising to a fully pedimented triangular pediment. The side walls are divided into two bays, articulated by pilasters, with sash windows topped by lancet-arched louvers.

The church was built in 1843, by a Congregationalist church congregation whose roots dated to 1753. The church was built in response to a controversy over ownership of the old meetinghouse, which was built prior to the principles of separation of church and state, and had been used for both civic and religious functions. The church's first pastor was Rev. Elijah Kellogg, then recently graduated from nearby Bowdoin College. Kellogg served as pastor until 1854, but remained attached to the town, retiring to Harpswell in 1882, and again serving the church from 1889 until his death in 1901. Kellogg is best known as an author of a series of children's books.

== See also ==
- Elijah Kellogg House
- National Register of Historic Places listings in Cumberland County, Maine
