= KK Radnički =

KK Radnički may refer to:

- Basketball clubs in Serbia
  - BKK Radnički, based in Belgrade (1945–present)
  - KK Radnički Basket/Radnički FMP, based in Belgrade (2009–2013); later renamed to FMP
  - KK Radnički Kovin, based in Kovin (1967–present)
  - KK Radnički Obrenovac, based in Obrenovac
  - KK Radnički Novi Sad, based in Novi Sad (1970–2009); relocated to Belgrade in 2009 and renamed to Radnički Basket
  - KK Radnički Valjevo, based in Valjevo (2013–present)
  - Basketball clubs in Kragujevac
    - KKK Radnički or SPD Radnički, (2015–present), currently competing in the 2nd-tier league
    - KK Radnički 1950, (2014–present), currently competing in the 2nd-tier league
    - KK Radnički Kragujevac (1950–2004), defunct team, merged into Radnički Zastava
    - KK Radnički Kragujevac (2009–2014), defunct team, formerly known as KK Lions Vršac
    - KK Radnički Zastava/Radnički KG 06, (2004–2011), defunct team
    - KK Radnički Student, (2008–2018), defunct team
- Basketball clubs in Bosnia and Herzegovina
  - KK Radnički Goražde, based in Goražde

== See also ==
- FK Radnički (disambiguation)
