= Elijah Kellogg House =

Historic house in Maine, United States

- U.S. National Register of Historic Places
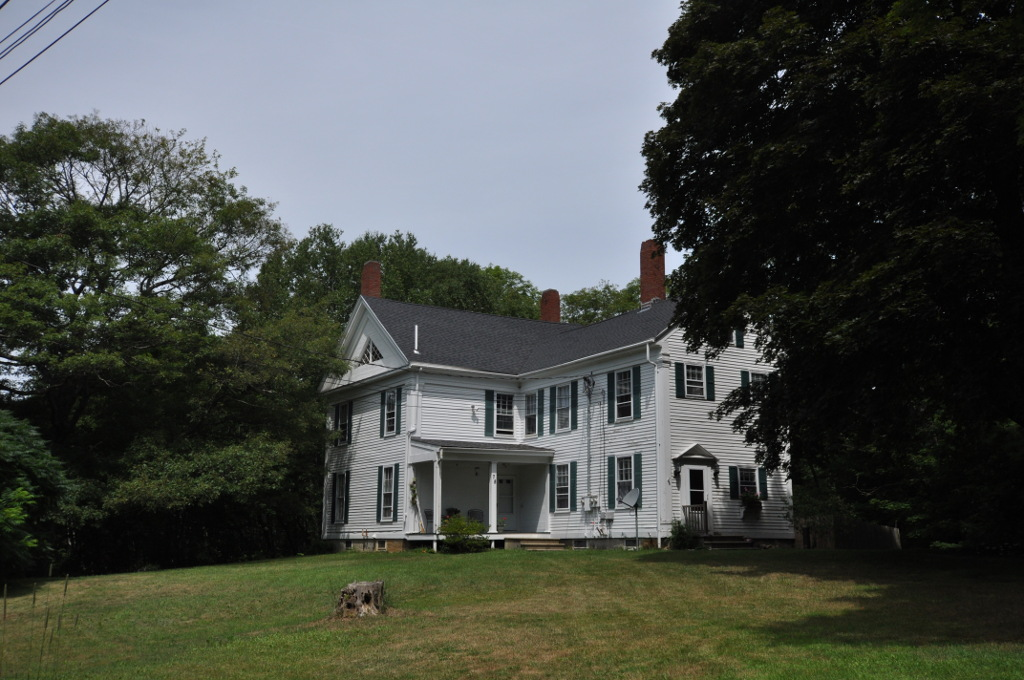

- Location within Maine Location within the United States
- Location: Barton Lane, Harpswell, Maine
- Coordinates: 43°50′6″N 69°58′3″W
- Area: 1 acre (0.40 ha)
- Built: 1849
- Built by: Elijah Kellogg
- Architectural style: Greek Revival
- NRHP reference No.: 75000096
- Added to NRHP: April 28, 1975

The Elijah Kellogg House is an historic house on Barton Lane in Harpswell, Maine. It is a well-preserved Greek Revival house, built in 1849 by Elijah Kellogg, a Congregationalist minister at the nearby church, and a lecturer and author of popular boy's adventure books. The house was listed on the National Register of Historic Places on April 28, 1975.

== Description and history ==
The house is located near Harpswell Center, on the north side of Barton Lane, a private road extending west from Harpswell Neck Road (Maine State Route 123), the principal north–south route on the Harpswell peninsula. It is an L-shaped 2 1/2-story wood-framed structure, with a rectangular main block and a long two-story ell extending to the east. The south facade is two bays wide, with widely separated windows, and corner pilasters rising to an entablature. Above thus is a fully pedimented gable, with a triangular diamond-pane window at its center. The front entrance is located at the eastern end of the ell, flanked by pilasters and topped by a gabled pediment. A secondary entrance, likely once the main entrance, stands at the crook of the L, sheltered by a simple shed-roof porch with square posts. The interior exhibits original Greek Revival woodwork and finishes throughout.

Elijah Kellogg, a native of Portland, attended Bowdoin College, and was called to the ministry by the Congregationalists of the nearby town of Harpswell, who were in the process of building a new church (now known as the Elijah Kellogg Church in his honor). Kellogg was officially the pastor there from 1845 until his death in 1901, although he spent many years at other postings. Kellogg acquired a national reputation for a series of children's adventure books, based on his life growing up in Maine.

== See also ==
- National Register of Historic Places listings in Cumberland County, Maine
