= Spartacus (disambiguation) =

Spartacus was the Thracian who led a slave uprising against Roman slavery.

Spartacus may also refer to:

== Media ==
=== Film and television ===
- Spartacus (film), a 1960 film directed by Stanley Kubrick, starring Kirk Douglas, Laurence Olivier and Peter Ustinov
- Spartakus and the Sun Beneath the Sea, a 1985 French animated television series, originally entitled Les Mondes Engloutis
- Spartacus (miniseries), a 2004 made-for-TV miniseries broadcast over two nights
- Spartacus (TV series), a Starz original television series
  - Spartacus: Blood and Sand, the first season of the series to be broadcast
  - Spartacus: Gods of the Arena, a series that serves as a prequel to Blood and Sand
  - Spartacus: Vengeance, the second season, serving as a sequel to Blood and Sand
  - Spartacus: War of the Damned, the third season, serving as a sequel to Vengeance
- Spartacus: House of Ashur, a television series serves as a sequel to previous series Spartacus (2010–2013).
- Sins of Rome, a 1953 film also known as Spartacus and Spartacus the Gladiator
- "Spartacus" (Up Pompeii!), a 1970 television episode

=== Radio ===
- Spartacus (radio play), a 1942 Australian radio play by Dymphna Cusack

=== Literature ===
- Spartacus (Fast novel), a historical novel by Howard Fast, the basis for Kubrick's film
- Spartacus (Gibbon novel), a historical novel by Lewis Grassic Gibbon
- Spartacus (1961 book), a political history by F.A. Ridley
- Spartacus, a fictional supercomputer in the James P. Hogan novel The Two Faces of Tomorrow
- Spartacus Educational, a book publisher and free online encyclopedia

=== Music and ballet ===
- Spartacus (Triumvirat album), by Triumvirat
- Spartacus (The Farm album), by The Farm
- Jeff Wayne's Musical Version of Spartacus
- Spartacus (ballet) or Spartak, ballet music by Aram Khachaturian

=== Publications ===
- Spartacus, a defunct newspaper by the Dutch resistance Marx–Lenin–Luxemburg Front
- Spartacus, the magazine of the Greek section of the reunified Fourth International organization of Communist Internationalists Organization of Communist Internationalists of Greece-Spartacus
- Spartacus International Gay Guide, an annual publication

== Sports ==
- Spartacus Rugby Club, a rugby club in Gothenburg, Sweden
- Fabian Cancellara (born 1981), Swiss cyclist by nickname

== Other ==
- Spartacus League, the 1918 German revolutionary movement from which the Communist Party of Germany emerged
- Twentieth Anniversary Macintosh, a Macintosh computer by its development codename
- Spartacus Trial, a series of criminal trials against Camorra
- Spartacus Books, a non-profit, volunteer and collectively run bookstore and resource centre in Vancouver, British Columbia, Canada
- Spartacus (ship), a dredger built in 2018
- Spartacus (horse)
- Spartacus (bug), a genus of true bugs in the family Miridae

== See also ==
- Spartak (disambiguation), the name of numerous sports clubs and teams in the former Soviet Union and other East European countries
- Spartakiad, athletic competitions held in the Soviet Union
- Adam Weishaupt (Brother Spartacus) (1748-1830), the code name of Adam Weishaupt, founder of the Illuminati
- Spartocids, the name of several kings of the Bosporan Kingdom Cimmerian Bosporus
- Sportacus, a fictional character from the children's television show LazyTown
- Sparta (disambiguation)
