= Spartacus to the Gladiators at Capua =

"Spartacus to the Gladiators at Capua" is a rhetorical monologue written by Elijah Kellogg for a student competition at Bowdoin College in 1842, and later published by Epes Sargent, one of the judges, in his 1846 School Reader. The piece, written as if it were an actual declamation by Spartacus to his fellows during the slave rebellion against the Roman Empire known as the Third Servile War, became popular in collections of rhetoric in the late 19th century.
