= Marat Safin =

Russian tennis player (born 1980)

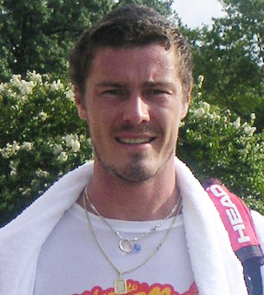
- Marat Safin in 2006
- Full name: Marat Mubinovich Safin
- Native name: Марат Мубинович Сафин
- Country (sports): Russia
- Residence: Monte Carlo, Monaco
- Born: 27 January 1980 (age 46) Moscow, Soviet Union
- Height: 1.94 m (6 ft 4 in)
- Turned pro: 1997
- Retired: 11 November 2009
- Plays: Right-handed (two-handed backhand)
- Prize money: US$14,373,291
- Int. Tennis HoF: 2016 (member page)

Singles
- Career record: 422–267 (61.2%)
- Career titles: 15
- Highest ranking: No. 1 (20 November 2000)

Grand Slam singles results
- Australian Open: W (2005)
- French Open: SF (2002)
- Wimbledon: SF (2008)
- US Open: W (2000)

Other tournaments
- Tour Finals: SF (2000, 2004)
- Olympic Games: 2R (2004)

Doubles
- Career record: 96–120 (44.4%)
- Career titles: 2
- Highest ranking: No. 71 (22 April 2002)

Grand Slam doubles results
- Australian Open: 1R (2000, 2009)
- French Open: 1R (2001)
- Wimbledon: 3R (2001)

Team competitions
- Davis Cup: W (2002, 2006)
- Hopman Cup: F (2009)
- Last updated on: 16 July 2016.

Marat Mubinovich Safin (Russian: Мара́т Муби́нович Са́фин, IPA: [mɐˈrat ˈsafʲɪn]; Tatar: Марат Мөбин улы Сафин, romanized: Marat Möbin ulı Safin; born 27 January 1980) is a Russian former professional tennis player and current coach. He was ranked as the world No. 1 in men's singles by the Association of Tennis Professionals (ATP) for nine weeks. Safin won 15 ATP Tour-level singles titles, including two majors at the 2000 US Open and 2005 Australian Open, and helped lead Russia to Davis Cup titles in 2002 and 2006.

Safin received four ATP Awards: 1998 Newcomer of the Year, 2000 Most Improved Player, and the 2001 and 2002 Fans' Favourite. When he first reached the world No. 1 ranking in November 2000, he became (at the time) the youngest No. 1 in the Open Era. Safin retired from the sport in November 2009. In 2011, he became a member of the State Duma representing the United Russia party. In 2016, he became the first Russian tennis player inducted into the International Tennis Hall of Fame. Safin is the older brother of former women's world No. 1 player Dinara Safina; they are the only brother-sister tandem in tennis history to have both achieved No. 1 singles rankings.

In 2025, Safin began coaching Andrey Rublev.

== Early life ==
Safin was born in Moscow to Tatar parents, Mubin ("Mikhail") Safin and Rauza Islanova. His ancestors come from Mishar village Bolshoye Rybushkino, located in Nizhny Novgorod Oblast. He speaks Russian, English, and Spanish. His parents are former tennis players and coaches. His younger sister, Dinara, is a former world No. 1 professional tennis player and silver medalist at the 2008 Olympic Games in Beijing. Safin's father managed the local Spartak Tennis Club, where Safin trained in his youth.

At the age of 14, Safin moved to Valencia, Spain to gain access to advanced tennis training programs which were not available in Russia. Safin says he grew "very fast ... with no muscles" and that he moved to Spain because clay courts were "better for the knees".

== Tennis career ==
=== Early career ===
Safin started his professional career in 1997. In 1998, Safin consecutively defeated Andre Agassi and defending champion Gustavo Kuerten at the French Open. He won his first ATP title at the age of 19, in Boston, and later in 1999 he reached the Paris, Bercy final, losing a closely contested four-set match to No. 1 Andre Agassi.

=== World No. 1 and Grand Slam history ===
7 Trophies in a Year
- Safin's seven ATP Tour singles titles in 2000
- Barcelona (ATP 500)
- Mallorca (ATP 250)
- Toronto (Masters 1000)
- US Open (Grand Slam)
- Tashkent (ATP 250)
- St. Petersburg (ATP 250)
- Paris (Masters 1000)

Safin held the No. 1 ATP ranking for 9 weeks during 2000 when he won his first Grand Slam tournament at the US Open, becoming the first Russian in history to win this tournament in the men's singles draw, by defeating Pete Sampras in straight sets in the final. He barely missed finishing the year as No. 1, the top spot being overtaken by Gustavo Kuerten at the last match of the season, the final of the 2000 Tennis Masters Cup and ATP Tour World Championships (3-0 win over Andre Agassi).

Safin reached three more Grand Slam finals, all at the Australian Open (2002, 2004, and 2005). He has cited nervousness as the reason for his loss in the 2002 final in four sets to Thomas Johansson, and physical exhaustion for the 2004 final loss in straight sets to Federer. He defeated Lleyton Hewitt in the 2005 final in four sets to secure his second Grand Slam in five years. En route to this final, he defeated top-ranked Roger Federer in a five-set semifinal match, saving match point. Safin described the match as "a brain fight." He also defeated future ten-time Australian Open champion Novak Djokovic, who was making his first appearance in the main draw of a Grand Slam tournament, in the first round losing just three games.

His best result at Wimbledon was reaching the semifinals in 2008, beating No. 3 Novak Djokovic en route. He often lost in the first or second rounds in other years, although he made the quarterfinals in 2001, losing in four sets to eventual champion Goran Ivanišević. Safin dismissed his performance in the 2001 tournament as a result of luck. Safin disliked playing on grass. Safin has said: "It's difficult to [break serve]. It's difficult to play-off the baseline because [of] a lot of bad bounces." With Safin's semifinal performance at Wimbledon in 2008, he became the fourth of five active players at the time to reach the semifinals in all four Grand Slams, joining Roger Federer, David Nalbandian, and Novak Djokovic. Other active players have since then joined the list.

=== Masters Series ===
Safin won five ATP Tennis Masters Series titles during his career. His first was in 2000 when he won the title in Toronto, Canada. He had three wins (2000, 2002, and 2004) in Paris, France, and one in 2004 in Madrid, Spain.

=== Tennis Masters Cup ===
In 2004, Safin reached the semifinal of the Tennis Masters Cup in Houston, Texas, where he was defeated by Federer, 6–3, 7–6^{(20–18)}. The second-set tiebreak (20–18) was the third-longest tiebreak in the Open Era. Safin also reached the semifinals in 2000.

=== Davis Cup ===
Safin helped Russia achieve its first Davis Cup victory in 2002, with a 3–2 tie-breaking win against France in the final round at the Palais Omnisports Paris Bercy. His Russian team included Yevgeny Kafelnikov, Mikhail Youzhny, Andrei Stoliarov, and captain Shamil Tarpischev. The team made Davis Cup history by being the second to win the event after losing the doubles tie-breaker, and becoming the first team to win a (live-televised) five-set finals match by coming back from a two-set deficit. Safin helped Russia to win the Davis Cup in 2006. After a straight-sets defeat by David Nalbandian in his first match, his doubles victory (partnering Dmitry Tursunov) against Nalbandian and Agustín Calleri and singles victory against José Acasuso drove Russia to victory.

In the 2009 Davis Cup quarterfinal tie, Russia was upset by the Israel Davis Cup team on indoor hard courts at the Nokia Arena in Tel Aviv. Russia was the top-ranked country in Davis Cup standings, and the stage was set by Safin, who prior to the tie told the press: "With all due respect, Israel was lucky to get to the quarterfinals." Safin was held out of the first day of singles, and then went on to lose the clinching doubles match in five sets partnered with doubles specialist Igor Kunitsyn.

=== Injury history ===
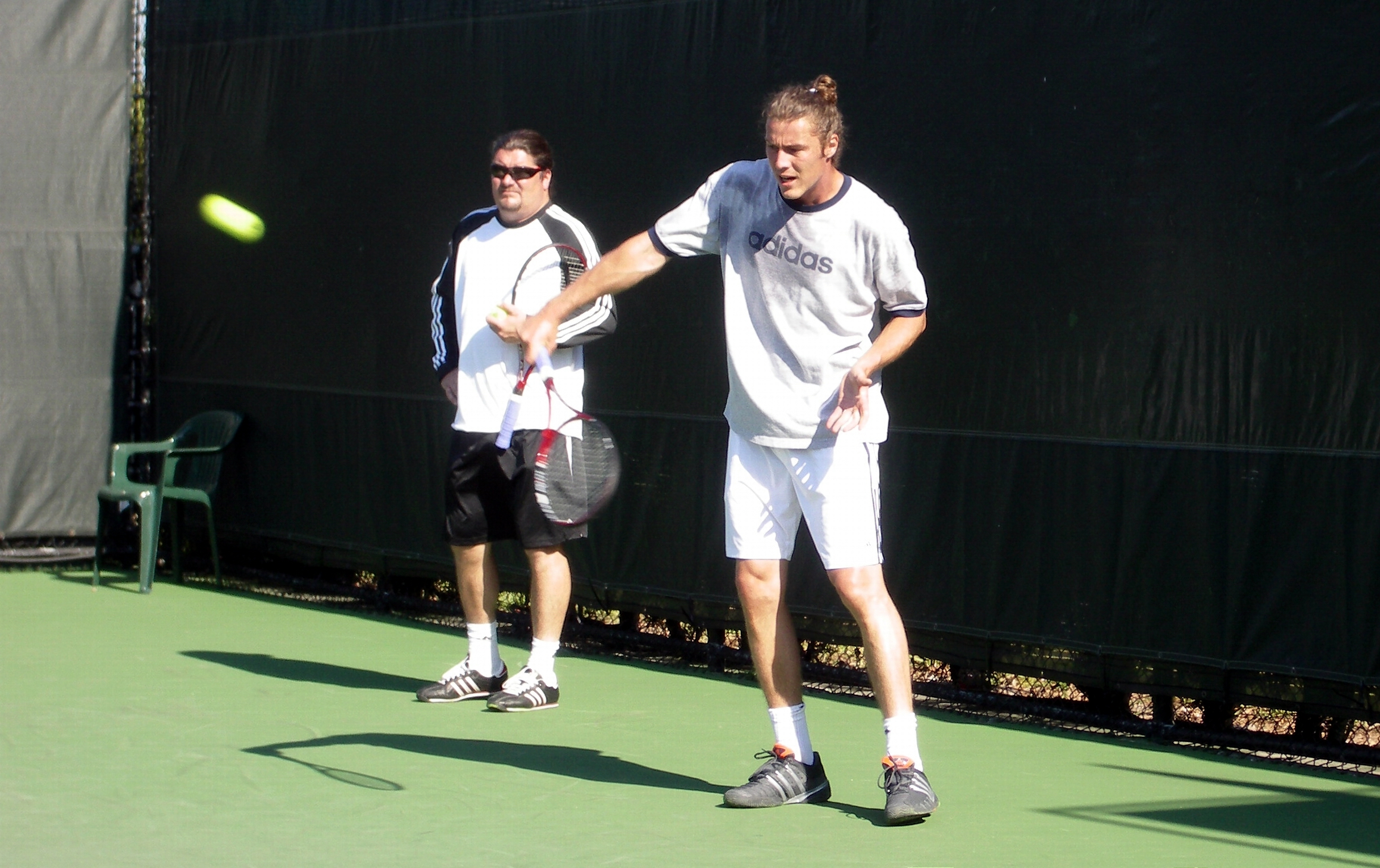
Safin at the Nasdaq 100 Open 2006

A succession of injuries hindered Safin's progress throughout his career.

In 2003, he missed the majority of the season due to a wrist injury.

During the 2005 clay-court season, Safin suffered a knee injury, which he played through all the way up to Wimbledon with the help of pain killers and anti-inflammatories. Safin was subsequently defeated in the early rounds of each of the seven tournaments he played between the Australian Open and the French Open, culminating in an early round defeat at the French Open. Safin made a surprise finals appearance at the Wimbledon tune-up tournament in Halle on grass. He lost the final narrowly to the defending champion, Federer. He only played one tournament in the summer hard-court season, in Cincinnati, where he lost in the quarterfinals to Robby Ginepri. He also missed the Tennis Masters Cup.

Injuries continued to bother Safin in 2006. Although Safin made appearances at the 2006 ATP Masters tournaments at Indian Wells, Miami, Monte Carlo, Rome and Hamburg, his ranking plummeted to as low as No. 104. He began to recover in time for the 2006 US Open, in which Safin defeated No. 4 David Nalbandian in a riveting second-round match. Safin then lost in the fourth round to No. 16 Tommy Haas, also in a fifth-set tiebreaker. Positive performances at the Thailand Open, where he was narrowly edged out by No. 7 seed, James Blake, and the Kremlin Cup in Moscow, the first all-Russian final at that event, losing to compatriot, Ukrainian-born Nikolay Davydenko, marked Safin's recovery. Despite the injury, Safin still posted seven wins against top ten players in 2006, fourth-most on the ATP tour behind just Federer (19), Nadal (10), and Blake (8).

=== Later career ===
==== 2007 ====
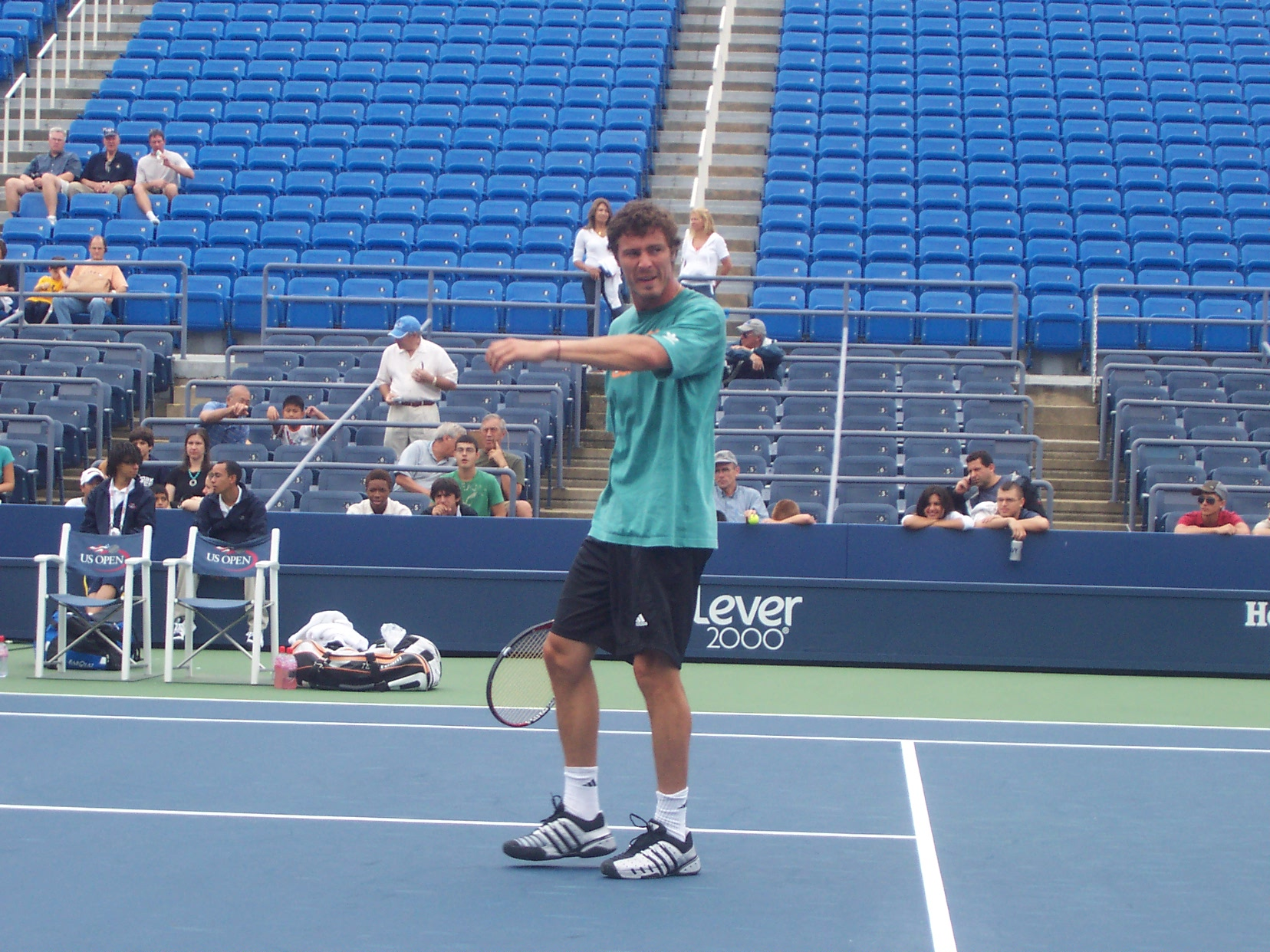
Safin practicing at the 2007 US Open

Safin did not play any warm-up tournaments in the run-up to the Australian Open. As Safin was forced to miss the tournament in 2006 because of injury, 2007 was his first Australian Open since he captured the title in 2005. Safin lost against sixth seed Andy Roddick in his third-round match in a grueling 3-hour match. Roddick commented after the match, "With Marat you know you are going to get an emotional roller-coaster. You just have to try and focus on yourself and I was able to do that tonight.

In April, Safin won the deciding quarterfinal Davis Cup rubber against France, beating Paul-Henri Mathieu in straight sets.

Safin reached the third round at Wimbledon, before falling to the defending champion Roger Federer. In July, Safin announced that he and his coach Alexander Volkov were parting ways, and that his new coach would be former pro Hernán Gumy. He won the doubles title at the Kremlin Cup in Moscow in October, his first ATP-level title since the 2005 Australian Open.

==== 2008 ====
At AAMI Kooyong Classic invitational in Melbourne, Safin beat Andy Murray before losing to Andy Roddick. In the third-place play-off, Safin beat Fernando González. At the Australian Open Safin beat Ernests Gulbis in straight sets but lost in the second round after a grueling five-set match against Baghdatis.

In February, Safin was granted wildcards into the tournaments at Memphis and Las Vegas. In Memphis, he was edged out by his 2002 Australian Open opponent, Thomas Johansson in the first round. In Las Vegas, he was defeated by Lleyton Hewitt in the semifinals.

In March, Safin lost in the first round of Indian Wells and Miami, to Jürgen Melzer and qualifier Bobby Reynolds, respectively. In the Davis Cup between Russia and the Czech Republic, Safin defeated No. 9 Tomáš Berdych in a five-set encounter, after being two sets down. This was the first time in his career that he had come back to win a match after being down two sets.

Safin's next tournament was in Valencia. He defeated No. 20-ranked Juan Carlos Ferrero. In spite of the fact that Ferrero is from the Valencia region, Safin was the more popular player, having been based in Valencia for many years and being a well-known Valencia CF fan. – local player Ferrero controversially favouring Real Madrid. He played Dutch teenager Robin Haase in the next round. He won the first set and was up 4–2 in the second set. However, Haase broke back to take it to a tiebreak. Safin had four match points, including one on his serve, but lost the tiebreak, and eventually the match. In the Monte Carlo Masters, Safin defeated Xavier Malisse, but then lost to No. 5 David Ferrer. At 2008 BMW Open in Munich, Germany, he beat Carlos Berlocq and Michael Berrer, but lost to Fernando González in his first quarterfinal of the year, and the first since June 2007 at Washington, D.C. Safin entered the 2008 French Open but was eliminated in the second round by countryman and fourth seed Nikolay Davydenko, in straight sets.

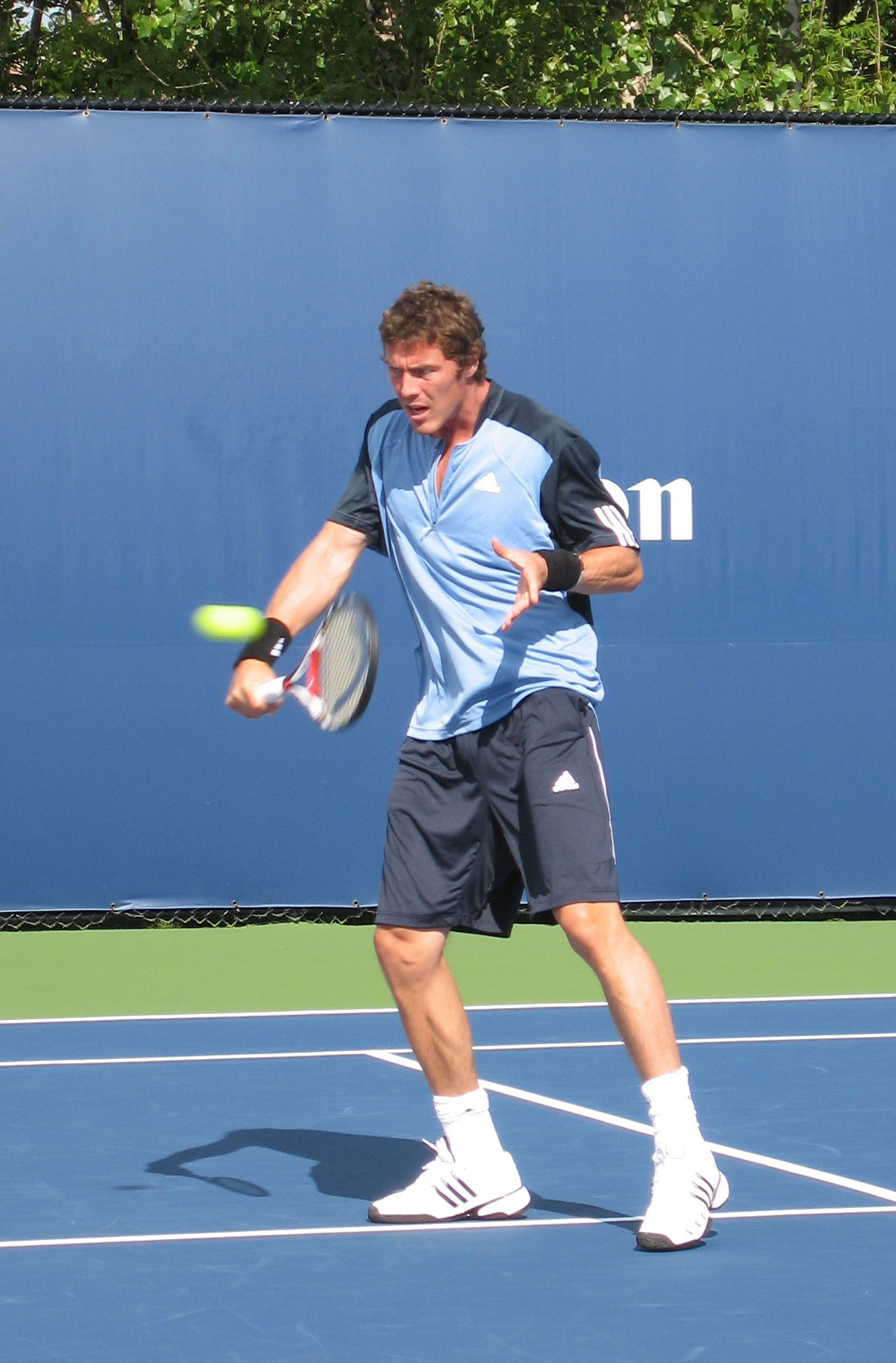
Safin at Canadian Masters 2008

Ranked at No. 75, Safin entered the 2008 Wimbledon Championships, where he defeated Fabio Fognini in the first round. In the second round, he defeated No. 3 player and 2008 Australian Open Champion Novak Djokovic. Safin's victory came as a shock as Djokovic was described as a "serious contender" to win the tournament. In the third round, he defeated Italian Andreas Seppi. In the fourth round, he defeated Stanislas Wawrinka. This was the first time he had reached the quarterfinals of a Grand Slam since the 2005 Australian Open. Safin went on to defeat Feliciano López in the quarterfinals to set up a semifinal clash with defending champion Roger Federer. His run to the semifinals was his best record in Wimbledon and made him the first Russian man to ever reach a Wimbledon semifinal. Safin attributed his great run at Wimbledon to the hard work he was putting in with coach Hernán Gumy. Safin then played at the Swedish Open, on clay, in Båstad beating Marc López, before losing his second-round match against Potito Starace.

Safin was awarded a wild card into the Rogers Cup Masters tournament in Toronto. He beat Sam Querrey in the first round. Because of rain delays, he had to play his next match against Stan Wawrinka on the same day. He lost that match. At the Countrywide Classic in Los Angeles he defeated John Isner and Wayne Odesnik to advance to the quarterfinals, where he was defeated by Denis Gremelmayr.

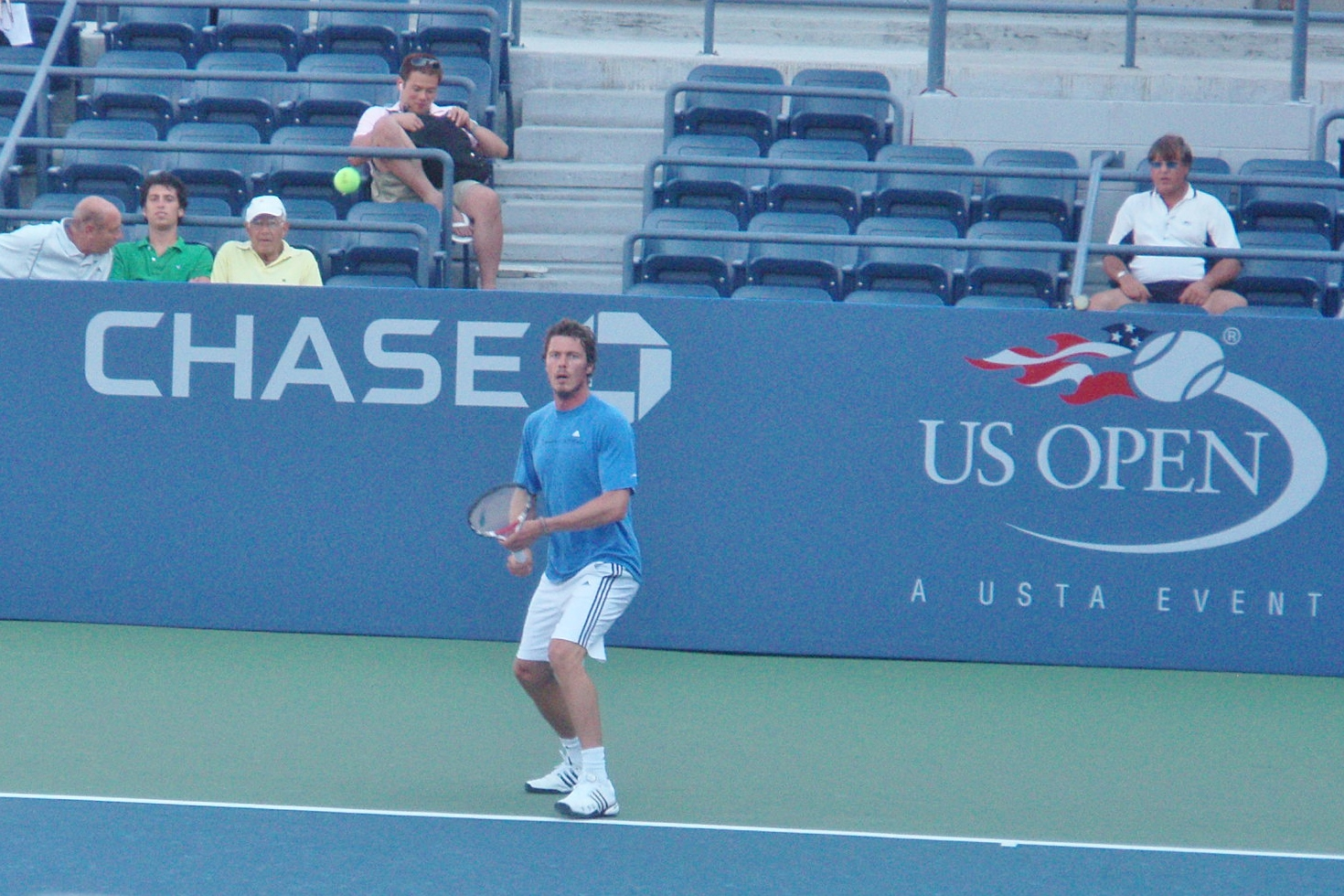
Marat Safin 2008 US Open

At the US Open, Safin lost in the second round to Tommy Robredo. At the Moscow Kremlin Cup, he defeated Noam Okun, Julien Benneteau, Nikolay Davydenko, and Mischa Zverev, only to lose to another compatriot Igor Kunitsyn in the final. It was Safin's first final appearance since 2006, in the same event. Following the Kremlin Cup, Safin withdrew from the Madrid Masters event with a shoulder injury. His next event was the St. Petersburg Open, at which he lost in the second round. He then lost his first-round match at the final ATP tournament of the calendar: the Paris Masters, to Juan Mónaco. In the post-match conference, he raised the possibility of his retirement from the sport. Via a message posted on his official website, he said he was going to take a holiday and then seriously consider his options regarding his future in tennis. He finished the year 2008 ranked at No. 29.

==== 2009 ====
Safin started the 2009 season by playing in the Hopman Cup event in Perth with his sister, Dinara Safina. He arrived at the event sporting a bandaged right thumb, two black eyes, a blood-filled left eye, and a cut near his right eye, all suffered in a fight several weeks earlier in Moscow. In the 2009 Hopman Cup, the pair played off in the final representing Russia, but each was defeated in the singles rubbers.

Safin withdrew from the Kooyong Classic tournament because of a shoulder injury, but recovered to play his first-round Australian Open match, which he won in straight sets over Iván Navarro of Spain. In the second round, Safin defeated another Spanish player, Guillermo García-López. In the third round, he came up against Federer and lost in straight sets. His next tournament was the Barclays Dubai Tennis Championships. He exited in the first round, losing to Richard Gasquet, and lost in the semifinals in doubles partnering David Ferrer. In March, Safin helped Russia advance to the Davis Cup quarterfinals by beating Victor Crivoi of Romania in the first rubber in straight sets.

Starting the year at No. 29 in the world, he placed in the top 20 during the year for the first time since the end of January 2006. His doubles ranking also improved from 300 to 195. In the first round at Wimbledon, at which he was seeded 14th, he was upset by 21-year-old American Jesse Levine.

Safin played at the Catella Swedish Open at Båstad, where he lost to Nicolás Almagro of Spain. He began his hard-court season by making it to the quarterfinals of the LA Tennis Open (his first quarterfinal of the season), where he lost to Tommy Haas.

He lost in the first round of the U.S. Open, his last Grand Slam, to Austrian Jürgen Melzer. After a second-round loss in the PTT Thailand Open, he found some late form, coming into the China Open tournament held in Beijing; beating José Acasuso in the first round. In the second round, he played Fernando González and produced a win. In the quarterfinals, he lost against top seed Rafael Nadal. As the tour rolled into Moscow for the Kremlin Cup, it marked the beginning of the end for Safin, as he played his last competitive matches in his native Russia. He defeated No. 6 Nikolay Davydenko in the first round, but lost in the second round. He then played at the 2009 St. Petersburg Open, reaching the semifinals.

=== Retirement ===
Safin's final tournament as a professional tennis player was at the 2009 Paris Masters. In the first round, he saved three match points with three aces against Thierry Ascione, eventually prevailing with a total of 24 aces and 41 winners. On 11 November 2009, Safin's career ended with a second-round defeat by reigning US Open champion Juan Martín del Potro, after which a special presentation ceremony was held on Centre Court at Bercy. Fellow tennis players who joined him in the ceremony included Juan Martín del Potro, Novak Djokovic, Gilles Simon, Tommy Robredo, Frederico Gil, Ivo Karlović, Albert Costa, Marc Rosset, and Younes El Aynaoui.

== Playing style ==
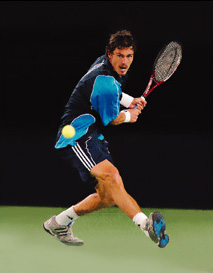
Safin hitting a backhand

Safin was often characterized as a powerful offensive baseliner. Boris Becker, in 1999, said that he had not seen anybody hit the ball as hard from both wings for "a long, long time". He has a strong and accurate serve and a great forehand, while also possessing one of the best two-handed backhands of all time. He was also capable of playing at the net, with his volleys also being effective. However, lack of consistency and motivation was described as Safin's ultimate weakness, starting after his victory at the 2005 Australian Open.

Safin generally dominated during the fast indoor hard/carpet season, which is usually during the last few weeks on tour; Safin considered grass to be his least favourite playing surface, despite the similarities between indoor courts and grass courts even though other opponents with similar playing styles generally dominate on it.

He is known as one of the most talented players ever during his time on the tour; however his career was hampered by persistent injuries and lack of determination that prevented the prolongation of his dominance, and is therefore agreed by many pundits and fans as one of the biggest underachievers in tennis.

Safin was also known for his emotional outbursts during matches, and smashed numerous rackets. Safin is estimated to have smashed 48 racquets in 1999. In 2011, Safin stated that during his career he broke 1055 racquets.

== Equipment ==
Safin has used the Head Prestige Classic 600 since 1997 however throughout the years sported numerous paintjobs of the latest Head Prestige rackets (i.e. intelligence, Liquidmetal, Flexpoint and Microgel). His racquets used to be strung using Babolat VS Natural Team Gut 17L gauge, but he then switched to Luxilon Big Banger Original at 62 to 67 pounds. His apparel was manufactured by Adidas and he was the figurehead of the 'Competition' line from 2000 onward.

== Career statistics ==
=== Grand Slam tournament performance timeline ===
Key
| W | F | SF | QF | #R | RR | Q# | DNQ | A | NH |

(W) winner; (F) finalist; (SF) semifinalist; (QF) quarterfinalist; (#R) rounds 4, 3, 2, 1; (RR) round-robin stage; (Q#) qualification round; (DNQ) did not qualify; (A) absent; (NH) not held; (SR) strike rate (events won / competed); (W–L) win–loss record.

| Tournament | 1997 | 1998 | 1999 | 2000 | 2001 | 2002 | 2003 | 2004 | 2005 | 2006 | 2007 | 2008 | 2009 | SR | W–L |
|---|---|---|---|---|---|---|---|---|---|---|---|---|---|---|---|
| Australian Open | A | A | 3R | 1R | 4R | F | 3R^{1} | F | W | A | 3R | 2R | 3R | 1 / 10 | 31–8 |
| French Open | A | 4R | 4R | QF | 3R | SF | A | 4R | 4R | 1R | 2R | 2R | 2R | 0 / 11 | 26–11 |
| Wimbledon | A | 1R | A | 2R | QF | 2R | A | 1R | 3R | 2R | 3R | SF | 1R | 0 / 10 | 16–10 |
| US Open | A | 4R | 2R | W | SF | 2R | A | 1R | A | 4R | 2R | 2R | 1R | 1 / 10 | 22–9 |
| Win–loss | 0–0 | 6–3 | 6–3 | 12–3 | 14–4 | 13–4 | 2–0 | 9–4 | 12–2 | 4–3 | 6–4 | 8–4 | 3–4 | 2 / 41 | 95–38 |

^{1}At the 2003 Australian Open, Safin withdrew prior to the third round.

=== Grand Slam finals: 4 (2 titles, 2 runner-ups) ===
| Result | Year | Championship | Surface | Opponent | Score |
|---|---|---|---|---|---|
| Win | 2000 | US Open | Hard | (United States) Pete Sampras | 6–4, 6–3, 6–3 |
| Loss | 2002 | Australian Open | Hard | (Sweden) Thomas Johansson | 6–3, 4–6, 4–6, 6–7^{(4–7)} |
| Loss | 2004 | Australian Open | Hard | (Switzerland) Roger Federer | 6–7^{(3–7)}, 4–6, 2–6 |
| Win | 2005 | Australian Open | Hard | (Australia) Lleyton Hewitt | 1–6, 6–3, 6–4, 6–4 |

== Post-retirement career ==
Since retirement Safin has been an official for the Russian Tennis Federation and a member of the Russian Olympic Committee. In 2011, he began playing on the ATP Champions Tour.

In December 2011, Safin was elected to the Russian Parliament as a member of Vladimir Putin's United Russia Party, representing Nizhny Novgorod. On 25 May 2017, he voluntarily resigned from the position.

In the spring of 2025, Safin began coaching ATP player Andrey Rublev.

== Personal life ==
In a 2008 interview with USA Today, Safin identified himself as a Muslim, stating, "I'm Russian, but I'm 100% Muslim. All the Muslim people are passionate, stubborn. We have hot blood." Ten years later in an interview for Alexander Golovin of Sports.Ru, he stated that although he believes something had created the world he does not really believe in a personal God.

== See also ==
- List of Grand Slam men's singles champions

== Notes ==
Awards and achievements
| Preceded by Julián Alonso | ATP Newcomer of the Year; 1998 | Succeeded by Juan Carlos Ferrero |
| Preceded by Nicolás Lapentti | ATP Most Improved Player; 2000 | Succeeded by Goran Ivanišević |
