= Spartak Tennis Club =

Tennis training club in Moscow, Russia

Coordinates: 55°47′54″N 37°40′55″E

Spartak Tennis Club, also known as Shiryaevka, is a tennis training ground located near Sokolniki Park in Moscow, Russia. Built in 1979, it formerly formed part of the Spartak sports society (which received its name by means of the then-popular Russian translation of the eponymous Italian book by Raffaello Giovagnoli). It has 15 outdoor clay courts, which remain open for four months during the year, and two indoor courts. The club is known for training a number of top Russian tennis players, some of which have become world No. 1 and have gone on to win Grand Slam titles. Competition for places at the academy was high as of 2013 due to its rigorous training program.

== Notable alumni ==
- Elena Dementieva
- Alina Jidkova
- Yevgeny Kafelnikov
- Anna Kournikova
- Anastasia Myskina
- Marat Safin (both of his and sister Dinara's parents were employees of the club)
- Dinara Safina (both of her and brother Marat's parents were employees of the club)
- Elena Rybakina
- Aleksandra Krunic
