= Raffaello Giovagnoli =

Italian writer and politician (1838–1915)

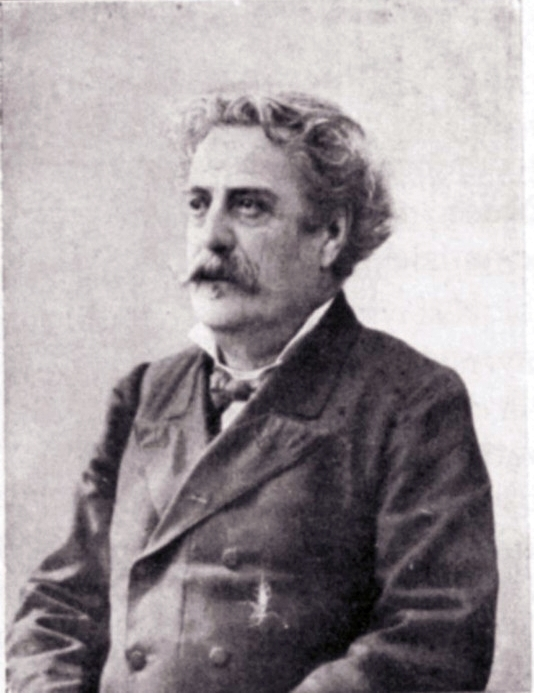
- Born: Raffaello Giovagnoli; 13 May 1838; Rome, Papal States
- Died: 15 July 1915 (aged 77); Rome, Kingdom of Italy
- Occupations: writer, politician
- Writing career
- Notable work: Spartacus

Raffaello Giovagnoli (13 May 1838 in Rome – 15 July 1915 in Rome) was an Italian writer, patriot and politician.

== Biography ==
=== Early life and career ===
Raffaello's mother, Clotilde Staderini, died from childbirth when Raffaello was only eleven. Because of this, much of his education came from the cultural and moral guidance of his father Francesco. A native magistrate of Monterotondo, of secular and reformist culture, Francesco Giovagnoli became involved in the revolutionary experience of the Roman Republic, and when he fell he was sent to confinement by pontifical tribunals. Meanwhile, the young man had already shown very precocious signs of intellectual curiosity: introduced to Ancient Roman history, at just ten years of age he had finished reading the classic historians, which was followed by studies of philosophy and Italian and Latin literature in the decade 1850–59, in Monterotondo, where his father was confined. This broad cultural background allowed him to make his debut in journalism, but his patriotic impetus prompted him to volunteer and set off with his three brothers Ettore, Mario, and Fabio. On the occasion of the untimely death of the latter, the four Giovagnoli brothers were described by Giuseppe Garibaldi as "I Cairoli di Lazio".

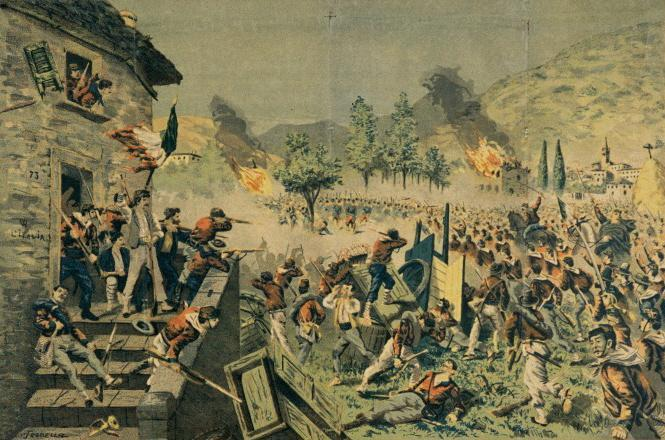
La Battle of Mentana, which closed the campaign of the Roman Agro on November 3, 1867

After a training course, from 1862 and for five years, Giovagnoli was a professor of literary subjects at the School for non-commissioned officers, an activity that he interrupted in 1866 to take part in Third War of Independence; resigned from the army, together with his brothers he joined the Garibaldian ranks in the unfortunate Campaign of the Roman Agro for the liberation of Rome, an enterprise of the Roman Agro.

=== Cultural commitment ===
Alongside the military occupations, Raffaello Giovagnoli did not fail to cultivate his literary, historical and artistic passions. He broadened his literary horizons by studying foreign authors – Shakespeare, Schiller and Béranger; resumed his work as a journalist, working for the Whistle , the Spirit, and then for the Century and Gazzetta di Firenze, newspaper which hosted the serial publication of Evelina, his first novel which reached some degree of popularity among readers. Equally successful they had had two previous works of his, the comedies Un caro giovane of 1866, and The widow of Putifarre of the following year; and the same consensus of the public had Audacity and shyness of 1870. Spartaco , published in installments on the Fanfulla in 1873–4, reconstructs the rebellion led by Spartacus, the Thracian slave, and emphasizes the brutality of human enslavement. Giovagnoli wrote the novel at the café of Valle theater, where a group of intellectuals gathered, including Luigi Arnaldo Vassallo and Pietro Cossa, with whom the scholar formed the League of spelling. He was also the author of historical essays: Ciceruacchio and don Pirlone. Historical recollections of the Roman revolution from 1846 to 1849 , Pellegrino Rossi and the Roman revolution , The Italian Risorgimento from 1815 to 1848 , works that highlight the wide popular participation in revolutionary movements.

Returning to the press, he fervently engaged in various journalistic activities: he helped found the newspaper La Capitale which he directed for a few months but which he disagreed with the publishing property passing to Il Diavolo rosa . Even this newspaper had a similar political coloring of the 'Capital', and was also sensitive to the aspirations of the First International. He also collaborated in Universal Suffrage and was editor of 'La Stampa' in Rome and Don Pirloncino , which through the satire hit the line-up of the Right and the clergy. In the eighties he was responsible for the literary page of the Capitan Fracassa , then he ventured into the political satire of the Don Quixote della Mancha and finally wrote for La Tribuna . It was finally in the mid-nineties, in the board of Parliament , a newspaper that supported Giovanni Giolitti.

Giovagnoli worked as a journalist as a journalist. Professor of Letters in Rome in 1874, four years later he was in Venice as a teacher at Liceo Foscarini, then again in Rome. Here since 1903 he taught History of the Risorgimento at the university, and after a period of waiting by parliamentary term he closed his career as director of the faculty of the Magisterium.

=== Political activity ===
Convinced anticlerical and advocate of a secular society and not conditioned by material or cultural interventions of religious order, Raffaello Giovagnoli militated in the ranks of the Left. He manifested his radical ideas through the writings in the press, with attacks on Alfonso La Marmora accused of giving in to the Church, and raising criticism of the corruption of Bettino Ricasoli politics. . He also held the office of municipal and provincial councilor in the decade between the seventies and eighties, elected in the districts of Rome and Tivoli, fighting in favor of the farmers and people of Lazio affected by the consequences of the earthquake of 1892.

Over time, his radical political positions were diluted until they became contiguous with the conservatism of Francesco Crispi, to whom Giovagnoli, associating him with Cavour, attributed wisdom in restoring action, ability to know how to interpret the needs of the moment, skill and intelligence in the work of colonialism; as well as, in contradiction with previous positions, it ended with the hope of a recomposition of the civil sphere with the religious one.

Freemason, he was a member of the Loggia Tito Vezio of Rome, in which it was begun around 1875; in 1877 he represented the Loggia The Light of the Balkans of Belgrade, belonging to the Great East of Italy, to the Masonic General Assembly of Rome.

He died on July 15, 1915, in Rome.

== Works ==
- Realistic novels:
  - Evelina, 1868;
  - Natalina. I drammi del lusso, 1878.
  - I racconti del maggiore Sigismondo, 1908.
- Historical novels:
  - Spartaco, 1874;
  - Opimia, 1875;
  - Plautilla, 1878;
  - Saturnino, 1879;
  - Faustina, 1881;
  - La guerra sociale. Aquilonia, 1884;
  - Messalina, 1885;
  - Benedetto IX, 1899;
  - Publio Clodio, 1905;
- Poetry:
  - Peccata juventutis meae, 1883
