= Rosa Maria Benedetta Gattorno Custo =

Blessed Rosa Maria Benedetta Gattorno Custo
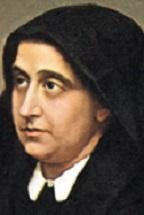

Widow; Nun
- Born: 14 October 1831; Genoa, Kingdom of Sardinia
- Died: 6 May 1900 (aged 68); Rome, Kingdom of Italy
- Venerated in: Roman Catholic Church
- Beatified: 9 April 2000, Saint Peter's Square, Vatican City by Pope John Paul II
- Feast: 6 May
- Attributes: Nun's habit; Crucifix; Rosary; Stigmata
- Patronage: Daughters of Saint Anne; Widowers; Mothers

Rosa Maria Benedetta Gattorno Custo (14 October 1831 – 6 May 1900) was an Italian Roman Catholic who was widowed and later became a nun. She was also the founder of the Daughters of Saint Anne and assumed the new name of "Anna Rosa" after she had established her order and made her religious profession as a nun. After her death, her order expanded in Europe and other parts of the world.

Anna Rosa devoted herself to all she came into contact with and established her order to cater to the needs of the sick and children that were abandoned.

She was beatified on 9 April 2000 after a miracle was attributed to her intercession.

== Life ==
Rosa Maria Benedetta Gattorno Custo was born on 14 October 1831 to Francesco Gattorno and Adelaide Campanella who were from the upper middle-class and she had five other siblings. She was baptized mere hours after her birth in the parish of San Donato. Custo received the sacrament of Confirmation at the age of twelve in the church of Santa Maria delle Vigne under Archbishop Placido Tadini. At the age of 21 she relocated to Marseille. On 5 November 1852 she married Gerolamo Custo at the time she moved to Marseille. The two were forced to return to Genoa after a series of financial difficulties. The two had three children.

Their eldest daughter Carlotta suffered from deafness after she was struck with a sudden illness. Her husband's death on 9 March 1858 paved the path for a new vocation to blossom within her. She cultivated this feeling and under the guidance of her confessor, Giuseppe Firpo, she took her vows as a member of the Franciscan third order on 8 December 1858. She dedicated herself to the poor and to children. In 1862 she received the stigmata and the pain hit her most on the date of the death of Jesus Christ each week.

She feared that her new path as a professed religious would force her to abandon her children and she asked for the advice of Francesco di Camporosso, a Capuchin friar. She also consulted with her confessor and the Archbishop of Genoa. She was received in a papal audience with Pope Pius IX at the beginning of 1866 and he encouraged her to start her new order while still being able to remain with her children.

Custo established the Daughters of Saint Anne on 8 December 1866 in Piacenza and she assumed the habit in 1867; her religious profession was made with twelve new nuns on 8 April 1870. The new order received the Decree of Praise in 1876 from Pius IX and received the official papal approval of Pope Leo XIII in 1879. The official Rule of the order was not introduced until 1892. Custo also collaborated with Bishop Giovanni Battista Scalabrini in providing assistance to the deaf.

She contracted influenza at the beginning of 1900 and her health started to deteriorate. She was to receive the last rites and died on 6 May 1900 at 9:00am.

== Beatification ==
The beatification process commenced on 30 March 1937 and the opening of a diocesan tribunal in Rome conferred upon her the posthumous title Servant of God. The local diocese concluded its collection of documentation and witness testimonies, which received formal ratification on 19 November 1991. The positio was compiled and was sent to the Congregation for the Causes of Saints in 1992.

The recognition of her life of heroic virtue allowed for Pope John Paul II to declare her to be Venerable on 21 December 1998.

The miracle attributed to her intercession was investigated in a diocesan tribunal and received its formal ratification on 20 December 1996. John Paul II approved the healing as a miracle on 28 June 1999 and beatified her on 9 April 2000.
