= Luigi Arnaldo Vassallo =

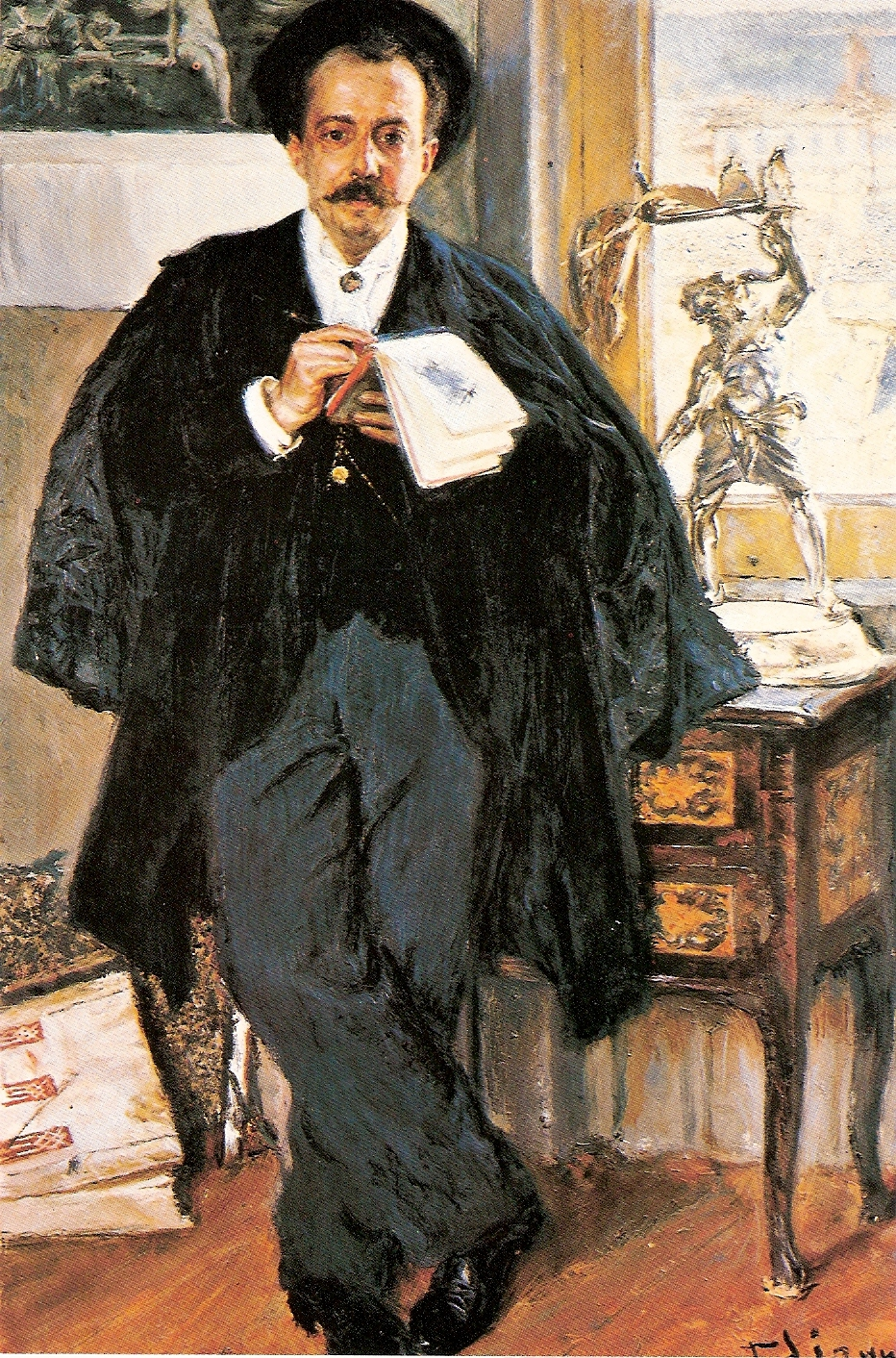
- Enrico Leone, Portrait of Luigi Arnaldo Vassallo, 1895, priv. col.
- Born: October 31, 1852; Genoa, Kingdom of Sardinia
- Died: August 10, 1906 (aged 53); Genoa, Kingdom of Italy
- Occupations: Writer journalist editor

Luigi Arnaldo Vasallo (31 October 1852 – 10 August 1906) was an Italian writer, journalist, and editor.

== Biography ==
Luigi Arnaldo Vassallo was born in Genoa on 31 October 1852. He began his journalism career in 1869, contributing to various Genoese newspapers. Following the dissolution of the Papal States, he relocated to Rome, where, along with Raffaello Giovagnoli, he helped found and edit the literary magazine Capitan Fracassa. He would later publish the journals Don Chisciotte, Folchetta, and in Genoa founded the political satirical journal Secolo XIX. He often wrote under the pseudonym of Gandolin. Among his works are La regina Margherita (romance 1882); Anticolerico Fracassa (1886), Dianna ricattatrice, Temporale di maggio (1893); La Signora Cagliostro (1894) Guerra in tempo di bagni (1896), and La famiglia De Tapetti (1904).

== Bibliograpjy ==
- Morando, Francesco Ernesto (1928). Luigi Arnaldo Vassallo (Gandolin) e i suoi amici. Bologna: Nicola Zanichelli.
- Capini, Anita Ginella (1996). Carissimo Arnaldo: lettere a Luigi Arnaldo Vassallo, Gandolin. Genoa: Brigati.
