= Spartak Stadium =

Spartak Stadium may refer to the following stadia:

- In Belarus:
  - Spartak Stadium (Babruysk)
  - Spartak Stadium (Mahilyow)
- In Bulgaria:
  - Spartak Stadium (Varna)
- In Kazakhstan:
  - Spartak Stadium (Taldykorgan)
- In Kyrgyzstan:
  - Spartak Stadium (Kyrgyzstan), in Bishkek
- In Russia:
  - Spartak Stadium (Moscow)
  - Spartak Stadium (Nalchik)
  - Spartak Stadium (Novosibirsk)
  - Spartak Stadium (Ryazan)
  - Republican Spartak Stadium in Vladikavkaz
- In Ukraine:
  - Spartak Stadium (Odesa), a stadium in Odesa
  - Spartak Stadium, a stadium in Kharkiv
  - Spartak Stadium, a stadium in Nizhyn
  - Spartak Stadium, former name of Yuvileiny Stadium in Sumy
  - Spartak Stadium, a stadium in Korosten
  - Spartak Stadium, a stadium in Melitopol
