= FK Radnički =

FK Radnički can refer to a number of football clubs in Serbia, Montenegro and Bosnia-Herzegovina.

The name Radnički usually stems from the clubs' association with workers and labour unions. Similar club association or sports society existed in the Soviet Union and known as Spartak.

- FK Radnički Bajmok, a Serbian football club based in Bajmok
- FK Radnički Beograd, Serbian football club based in New Belgrade
- FK Radnički Berane, Montenegrin football club based in Berane
- FK Radnički Kovin, Serbian football club based in Kovin
- FK Radnički 1923, Serbian football club based in Kragujevac
- FK Radnički Lukavac, Bosnia and Herzegovina football club based in Lukavac
- FK Radnički Niš, Serbian football club based in Niš
- FK Radnički Nova Pazova, Serbian football club based in Nova Pazova
- FK Radnički Obrenovac, Serbian football club based in Obrenovac
- FK Radnički Pirot, Serbian football club based in Pirot
- FK Radnički Šid, Serbian football club based in Šid
- FK Radnički Sombor, Serbian football club based in Sombor
- FK Radnički Sremska Mitrovica, Serbian football club based in Sremska Mitrovica
- FK Radnički Svilajnac, Serbian football club based in Svilajnac
- FK Radnički Zrenjanin, a Serbian football club based in Zrenjanin

== See also ==
- FK Radnik Bijeljina, Bosnia and Herzegovina football club based in Bijeljina
- FK Radnik Surdulica, Serbian football club based in Surdulica
- NK Radnik Velika Gorica, a Croatian football club based in the town of Velika Gorica in Zagreb County
- Spartak (disambiguation)
