= Elijah Kellogg =

American missionary (1813–1901)

Elijah Kellogg, Jr.
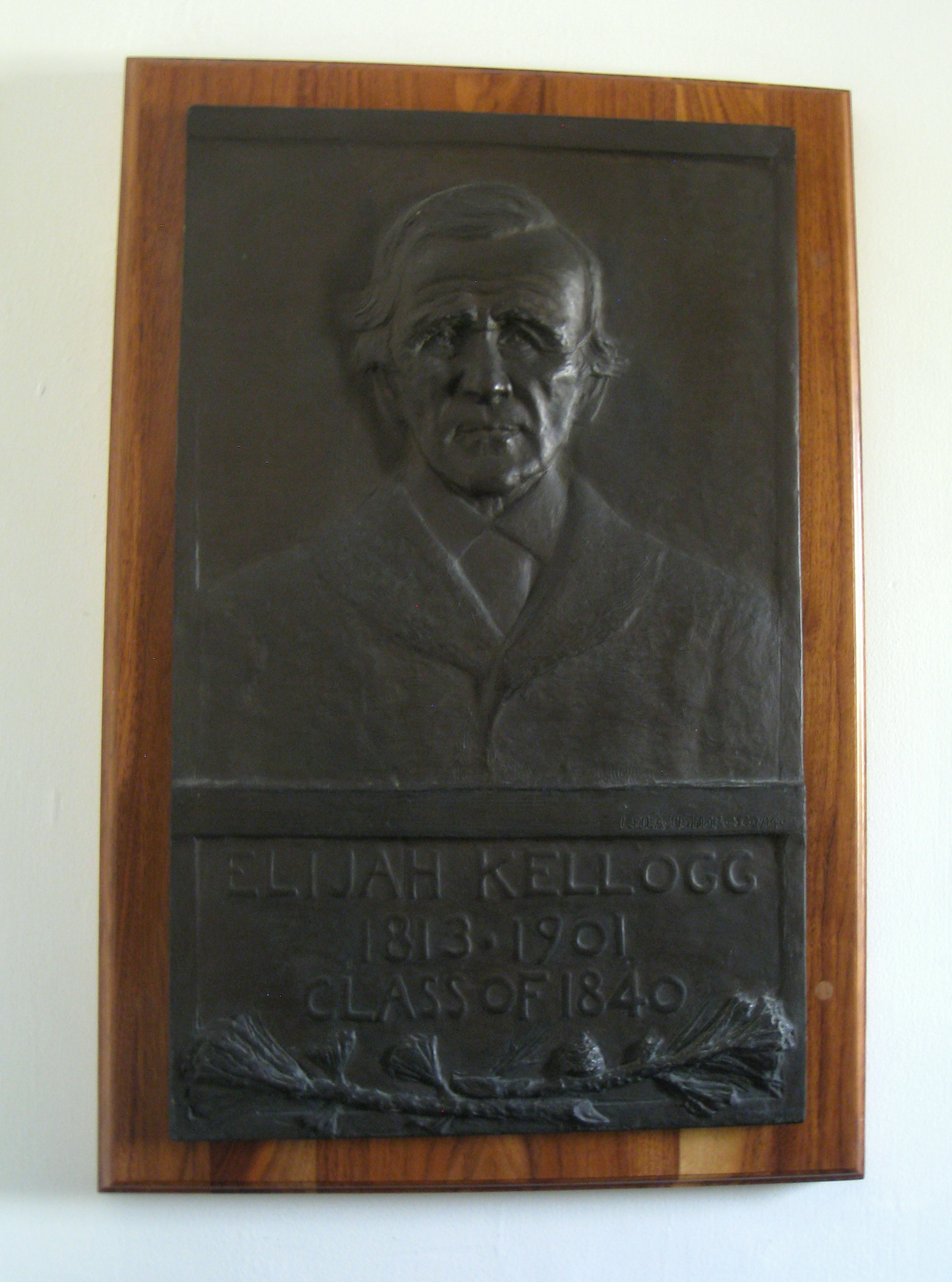
- A bronze relief of Kellogg at Bowdoin College Chapel
- Born: 20 May 1813; Portland, Maine
- Died: March 17, 1901 (aged 87); Topsham, Maine
- Education: Bowdoin College, Andover Theological Seminary
- Occupations: Minister, lecturer and author
- Movement: Congregational Church

Elijah Kellogg Jr. (May 20, 1813 – March 17, 1901) was an American Congregationalist minister, lecturer and author of popular boys' adventure books.

== Professional life ==
Born in Portland, Maine, Kellogg was the son of a minister and missionary to local Native Americans. He graduated from Bowdoin College in 1840 and Andover Theological Seminary. Kellogg served as a minister of the church in Harpswell, Maine 1844–54, as chaplain of the Boston Seaman's Friend Society and pastor of the Mariners' Church of Boston 1855–1865; and ended his career as minister of the church in Topsham, Maine, from 1871 until his death in 1901. He is buried at Portland's Western Cemetery.

== Family and heritage ==
Kellogg married Hannah Pearson Pomeroy and had three sons and one daughter. Wilmot B. Mitchell of Bowdoin edited Elijah Kellogg, the Man and His Work: Chapters From His Life and Selections from His Writings (Boston: Lee and Shepard, 1903). Bowdoin College offers an online collection guide to Kellogg's personal papers and those of his father (who was a trustee of Bowdoin). Elijah Kellogg Church, Congregational in Harpswell, Maine (where he served as pastor), is now named for him.

== Writing ==
Kellogg began writing children's books in the 1860s, and was highly productive. While he is best known to students of rhetoric as the author of the once-popular monologue "Spartacus to the Gladiators at Capua" (written for a student competition while he was still an undergraduate at Bowdoin), he later produced several series of books. These include:

=== Elm Island Series ===
- Lion Ben of Elm Island (1868)
- Charlie Bell: The Waif of Elm Island (1868, copyright renewed 1896)
- The Ark of Elm Island (1869)
- The Boy Farmers of Elm Island (1869)
- The Young Ship-Builders of Elm Island (1870)
- The Hard-Scrabble of Elm Island (1870)

=== Pleasant Cove Series ===
- Arthur Brown: The Young Captain (1870)
- The Young Deliverers of Pleasant Cove (1871)
- The Cruise of the Casco (1871)
- The Child of the Island Glen (1872)
- John Godsoe's Legacy (1873)
- The Fisher Boys of Pleasant Cove (1874)

=== Whispering Pine Series ===
(Set at Bowdoin College, his alma mater, of which his father was later a trustee.)

- The Spark of Genius; or, The College Life of James Trafton (1871)
- The Sophomores of Radcliffe; or, James Trafton and His Bosom Friends (1871)
- The Whispering Pine; or, the Graduates of Radcliffe Hall (1872)
- Winning His Spurs; or, Henry Morton's First Trial (1872)
- The Turning of the Tide; or, Radcliffe Rich and His Patients (1873)
- A Stout Heart; or, the Student From Over the Sea (1873)

=== Forest Glen Series ===
- Saved By the Wind; or, The Poor Boy's Future (1874)
- Wolf Run; or, the Boys of the Wilderness (1875)
- Brought to the Front; or, The Young Defenders (1875)
- The Mission of Black Rifle; or, On the Trail (1876)
- Forest Glen; or, the Mohawk's Friendship (1877)
- Burying the Hatchet; or, the Young Brave of the Delawares (1878)

=== Good Old Times Series ===
- Good Old Times; or, Grandfather's Struggle for a Homestead (1877, rev. 1905)
- A Strong Arm and a Mother's Blessing (1880)
- The Unseen Hand; or, James Renfew and His Boy Helpers (1881)
- The Live Oak Boys; or, The Adventures of Richard Constable Afloat and Shore (1882)

=== Stand-alone books ===
- Norman Cline (1869)
