= Sunset Song (disambiguation) =

Sunset Song is a Scottish novel by Lewis Grassic Gibbon.

Sunset Song may also refer to:

- Sunset Song (TV series), a 1971 BBC Scotland miniseries
- Sunset Song (film), a 2015 British drama film

== See also ==
- Sunset (disambiguation) § Songs
- "Sunsets" (song)
- Sunset Sons, a British-Australian band
