= Maurice Roëves =

British actor (1937–2020)

- Born: John Maurice Roëves; 19 March 1937; Sunderland, County Durham, England
- Died: 14 July 2020 (aged 83); Edinburgh, Scotland
- Education: Glasgow College of Dramatic Art
- Occupation: Actor
- Years active: 1966–2020
- Spouse: Jan Wilson (m. 1965, divorced) Vanessa Rawlings-Jackson (m. 2001)
- Children: 1

John Maurice Roëves (/ˈroʊ.iːvz/; 19 March 1937 – 14 July 2020) was a British actor. He appeared in over 120 film and television roles, in both the United Kingdom and the United States. His breakthrough performance was as Stephen Dedalus in the 1967 film adaptation of James Joyce's Ulysses. He was a regular fixture on BBC and BBC Scotland programmes, often portraying what The Guardian called "tough guys, steely villains or stalwart military figures with directness, authenticity and spiky energy".

== Early life and education ==
Roëves was born in Sunderland to Rhoda (nee Laydon) and Percival Roëves. When he was six the family moved to Glasgow, where he was raised from then on. He left Hyndland Secondary School early to help his father, and undertook National Service in the Royal Scots Greys, where he was a tank mechanic. After he left the Army he studied at the College of Dramatic Art at the Royal Conservatoire of Scotland, where he won a Gold Medal for acting.

== Career ==
Roëves took to the stage at the Citizens Theatre in Glasgow in the 1960s in a production of The Merchant of Venice.

Roëves's first notable roles were in films. He played the leading role of Stephen Dedalus in the film adaptation of James Joyce's Ulysses (1967) and also appeared in Oh! What a Lovely War (1969). Other films he acted in include A Day at the Beach (1970), The Eagle Has Landed (1976), Hidden Agenda (1990), The Last of the Mohicans (1992), Judge Dredd (1995), The Acid House (1998) and Beautiful Creatures (2000). In 2003 he appeared in May Miles Thomas's film Solid Air. His final film role was in Justin Kurzel's Macbeth (2015), playing Menteith.

His first television role was in the series Scobie in September in 1969. Roëves played a schoolmaster in Out of the Unknown, in the episode "Taste of Evil" in 1971. A short thriller series called The Scobie Man followed in 1972. He then went on to appear in The Sweeney (1975), Danger UXB (1979), The Nightmare Man (1981), the Doctor Who serial The Caves of Androzani (1984), Days of Our Lives (1986), North and South (1985), Tutti Frutti (1987), Rab C. Nesbitt (1990), The New Statesman (1990), Spender (1991), Star Trek: The Next Generation (1993), the BBC adaptation of Vanity Fair (1998), EastEnders (2003), A Touch of Frost (2003) and Skins (2008). He played Chief Superintendent David Duckenfield in the television film Hillsborough (1996). In 2006 he appeared in the BBC docudrama Surviving Disasters, portraying Sir Matt Busby in the story of the Munich air disaster. He starred as Robert Henderson in BBC Scotland's drama River City. Roëves also appeared as a retired police superintendent in Southcliffe (episode 3, "Sorrow's Child").

== Personal life ==
In 2014 he stated that he had moved to Nottinghamshire with his wife, Vanessa Rawlings-Jackson. They also spent part of each year at a condo in Santa Fe, New Mexico, United States.

== Death ==
Roëves died in Edinburgh on 14 July 2020 at the age of 83, after a period of ill health.

== Filmography ==
Year	Title	Role	Notes
1966	The Fighting Prince of Donegal	Martin	
1967	Ulysses	Stephen Dedalus	
1969	Oh! What a Lovely War	George Patrick Michael Smith	
1970	A Day at the Beach	Nicholas	
1971	When Eight Bells Toll	Lt. Williams	
1972	Young Winston	Brockie	
1976	The Eagle Has Landed	Maj. Corcoran	
1981	Outland	First Victim	Uncredited
1981	Escape to Victory	Captain Pyrie	
1982	Who Dares Wins	Maj. Steele	
1990	Hidden Agenda	Harris	
1990	The Big Man	Cam Colvin	
1992	The Last of the Mohicans	Col. Edmund Munro	
1995	Judge Dredd	Miller	
1996	Guardians	Sergeant Reed	
1998	The Acid House	God/Drunk/Priest	Segments: "The Granton Star Cause", "A Soft Touch" and "The Acid House"
2000	Beautiful Creatures	Ronnie McMinn	
2003	Solid Air	Robert Houston	
2005	The Dark	Dafydd	
2007	Hallam Foe	Raymond	
2008	Fast Track: No Limits	Schmitty	
2009	The Damned United	Jimmy Gordon	
2010	Brighton Rock	Chief Inspector	
2013	Harrigan	Billy Davidson	
2014	Luna	Jacob As The Doctor	
2015	Macbeth	Menteith	

== Television ==
Year	Title	Role	Notes
1966	Dr. Finlay's Casebook	Mr. Thompson	Episode: "For Services Rendered"
1966	The Wednesday Play	Ian Tiggott	Episode: "Cook, Hen and Courting Pitt"
1967	The Revenue Men	Private Bingham	Episode: "Swallowtale"
1969	Scobie in September	Scobie	Miniseries
1969	ITV Playhouse	Geoff/Sam/Franco	Episode: "Square on the Hypotenuse"
1970	The Borderers	Robert Scott	Episode: "Where the White Lillies Grow"
1970	Doomwatch	Peter Shipton	Episode: "The Devil's Sweets"
1970	Thirty-Minute Theatre	Cass	Episode: "The Tidewatchers"
1971	A Family at War	Sergeant Hazard	Episode: "Hazard"
1971	Out of the Unknown	Stephen Chambers	Episode: "Taste of Evil"
1971	Paul Temple	Japp	Episode: "Critics, Yes! But This Is Ridiculous!"
1971-1976	Play for Today	Various	3 episodes
1971-1979	Jackanory	Storyteller	4 stories
1972	Dixon of Dock Green	Richard Bennett	Episode: "Molenzicht"
1972	The Shadow of the Tower	Humphrey Stafford	2 episodes
1972	Jason King	Riguera	Episode: "A Kiss for a Beautiful Killer"
1973	Scotch on the Rocks	Brodie	Miniseries
1973	Sutherland's Law	Callum Lithgow	Episode: "The Climb"
1974	Marked Personal	Peter Barker	2 episodes
1975	Whodunnit?	Ian Cockburn	Episode: "Death at the Top"
1975	Oil Strike North	McGraw	3 episodes
1975	The Sweeney	Phil Deacon	Episode: "Big Brother"
1975	Crown Court	Bernard Watson	Serial: "Dicing"
1977	Warship	Sub-Lieutenant Carwith	Episode: "Jack Fell Down"
1977	Target	Harry Skeats	Episode: "Blow Out"
1978	Return of the Saint	Willcox	Episode: "The Judas Game"
1979	Danger UXB	Sergeant James	Miniseries
1979	S.O.S. Titanic	Leading Stoker: Fred Barret	TV movie
1980	BBC Television Shakespeare	Antonio	Episode: Twelfth Night
1981	BBC2 Playhouse	Adolf Hitler	Episode: "Journal of Bridget Hitler"
1981	The Nightmare Man	Inspector Inskip	Miniseries
1982	Inside the Third Reich	Rudolf Hess	TV movie
1982	The Chinese Detective	Doc Halliday	Episode: "Bounty Hunter"
1984	Magnum, P.I.	Hopkins	Episode: "Holmes is Where the Heart Is"
1984	Doctor Who	Stotz	Serial: "The Caves of Androzani"
1984	Remington Steele	Angus Whitewood	Episode: "Blue Blooded Steele"
1985	Lytton's Diary	Maxim	Episode: "Come Uppance"
1985	Code Name: Foxfire		Episode: "Goodbye, Mr Microchips"
1985	Big Deal	Mr. Smith	Episode: "Windfall"
1985	Bergerac	Vacarro	Episode: "Sins of the Fathers"
1985-1989	Days of Our Lives	David Helpern/The Professor	15 episodes
1986	North and South	Shain	Book Two: "Love and War"
1987	Tutti Frutti	Vincent Driver	Miniseries
1988	The Play on One	Jack	Episode: "Unreported Incident"
1989	Hunter	Michael Mullenby	Episode: "Blood Line"
1989	Jake and the Fatman	Tattooist	Episode: "It Ain't Necessarily So"
1991	El C.I.D.	Charlie	Episode: "Piece of Cake"
1991	The New Statesman	Ken Price	Episode: "Natural Selection"
1991	Spender	Mal Balmer	Episode: "Tough"
1991	Rumpole of the Bailey	Clive Clympton	Episode: "Rumpole and the Right to Silence"
1992	Moon and Son	Russ Napley	Episode: "Music in the Air"
1992	Rab C. Nesbitt	Young Young McGurn	Episode: "That's Entertainment"
1992	Baywatch	Roland	Episode: "Princess of Tides"
1993	Cheers	Sean	Episode: "Bar Wars VII: The Naked Prey"
1993	Star Trek: The Next Generation	Romulan Captain	Episode: "The Chase"
1994	Murder, She Wrote	Police Captain	Episode: "Fatal Paradise"
1995-1996	Moses	Zerack	2 episodes
1996	Hillsborough	Chief Superintendent Duckenfield	TV movie
1998	Grafters	Lennie	3 episodes
1998	Vanity Fair	Captain McMurdo	1 episode
2000	Forgive and Forget	Michael O'Neil	TV movie
2003	A Touch of Frost	Mr. McIntosh	Episode: "Close Encounters"
2003	EastEnders	Geoff	2 episodes
2004	William and Mary	Ally	1 episode
2004	The Bill	DI Tom Henry	2 episodes
2004-2007	Holby City	Roy Collins/Cecil Heaney	3 episodes
2006	Surviving Disaster	Matt Busby	Episode: "Munich Air Crash"
2008	Trial & Retribution	Ken Randle	2 episodes
2008	Skins	Alex	Episode: "Sid"
2008	The Invisibles	McLelland	1 episode
2009	New Tricks	Frank Powell	Episode: "Death of a Timeshare Salesman"
2010	Casualty	Carl Jackson	2 episodes
2010-2013	Doctors	William McIntyre/Earnest Pike	2 episodes
2012	Falcón	Virgilio Guzmán	Episode: "The Silent and the Damned"
2013	Case Histories	Ray	Episode: "Started Early, Took My Dog"
2013	Southcliffe	Marsden	2 episodes
2016	Two Doors Down	Willie	1 episode
2020	The Nest	Lenny	1 episode
