= Spartacus (Gibbon novel) =

Historical novel by Lewis Grassic Gibbon

- Author: Lewis Grassic Gibbon
- Language: English
- Publication date: 1933

Spartacus is a historical novel by the Scottish writer Lewis Grassic Gibbon, first published in 1933 under his real name of James Leslie Mitchell.

Although Gibbon is mainly known for his trilogy A Scots Quair, this is his best-known full-length work outside that trilogy.

As its name suggests, it is an account of the great slave revolt in Ancient Rome, led by the former gladiator Spartacus.

== Plot summary ==
The central character is not Spartacus himself, but Kleon, a fictional Greek slave and eunuch who, despite occupying a privileged position in his master's household, flees to join Spartacus' rebel army. In the first chapter, we are told how he was sold into slavery as a child and sexually abused by his first owner before being castrated and receiving his education.

Another important character is Elpinice, a slave woman who helps Spartacus and his fellow gladiators escape from Capua, and who becomes Spartacus's lover. She gives birth to a son, but while Spartacus is distracted leading his men, she is raped and murdered by Roman soldiers; her infant child is also killed. The novel touches on Gibbon's views on human history, with Spartacus seen as a survivor of the prosperous but decadent Golden Age.

However, in spite of various additions and speculations, it does stick fairly closely to the known historical facts about the revolt. Plutarch's written life of Crassus (who suppressed the revolt) is clearly the main source, but it does make use of some other classical sources, including Appian and Sallust.

== See also ==
- Spartacus, the 1951 novel by Howard Fast
- Spartacus, the famous 1960 Kirk Douglas film based on Fast's novel
- The Gladiators, Arthur Koestler's 1939 novel about Spartacus.
