= Edith MacArthur =

Scottish actress (1926–2018)

- Edith MacArthur, from a 1989 newspaper.
- Born: March 8, 1926; Ardrossan, Ayrshire
- Died: 25 April 2018 (aged 92); Edinburgh, Scotland
- Other names: Edith Macarthur
- Occupation: Actress

Edith MacArthur MBE (8 March 1926 – 25 April 2018) was a Scottish actress noted for her elegant screen presence.

== Early life ==
MacArthur was born in Ardrossan, North Ayrshire, the daughter of Donald MacArthur and Minnie Ross MacArthur. She studied at Ardrossan Academy and the Royal College of Music. During World War II, she worked at the Admiralty Map Correction station in Ayrshire.

== Career ==
MacArthur began acting with the amateur Ardrossan & Saltcoats Players. She made her professional stage debut with the Wilson Barrett Company at the Lyceum Theatre, Edinburgh. She worked in various Scottish stage companies, including Perth Rep, the Edinburgh Gateway and the Glasgow Citizens, before moving to London in 1960.

She made her London stage debut that year, in Alec Coppel's The Gazebo, at the Savoy. With the Royal Shakespeare Company in the 1960s, she played Lady Montague in Romeo and Juliet. She was twice in London productions of The Prime of Miss Jean Brodie, in different roles, in 1966 and in 1994–1995. She and Tom Fleming were known for Carlyle and Jane, their staged readings of the letters of Thomas Carlyle and Jane Welsh Carlyle. She was long associated with the Pitlochry Festival Theatre.

MacArthur was frequently seen on television, with a long list of credits including Z-Cars, The Borderers, The Troubleshooters, Sutherland's Law, The Standard, The Omega Factor, The Sandbaggers, Doctor Finlay, Hamish Macbeth, Casualty and Sea of Souls. In 1972, she played the tragic Scottish mother Jean Guthrie in Sunset Song, the television adaptation of Lewis Grassic Gibbon's novel. Her best-known role was the Lady Laird Elizabeth Cunningham in Take the High Road, which she portrayed from the first episode in 1980, until December 1986 when the character was killed off in a car crash.

MacArthur was said to have discovered the future Doctor Who actor David Tennant. After seeing his first performance at age 10 in Paisley, she told his parents he would become a successful stage actor. Tennant went on to play MacArthur's son twice on stage, in Long Day's Journey into Night and Hay Fever.

In 2000, MacArthur was made an MBE for her contribution to the dramatic arts.

== Personal life ==
MacArthur died 25 April 2018 at the age of 92, in Edinburgh. In her obituary in The Scotsman, she was described as "an actress whose breathtaking elegance and beauty – and uncompromising dedication to the craft she loved – was matched by a brilliant intelligence, and wicked, earthy sense of humour." Her papers are archived at the National Library of Scotland.

== Theatre ==
Year	Title	Role	Company	Director	Notes
1982 & 1985	Ane Satyre of the Thrie Estaites	Chastitie	Scottish Theatre Company	Tom Fleming	play by Sir David Lindsay, adapted by Robert Kemp
1982-83	Jamie the Saxt		Scottish Theatre Company	Tom Fleming	play by Robert McLellan
1985	The Wallace		Scottish Theatre Company	Tom Fleming	play by Sydney Goodsir Smith
1985	Love: Poetry and Song		The Saltire Society	George Bruce	programme arranged by Paul Henderson Scott
1989	The Cherry Orchard	Ranevskaya	Lyceum Theatre Company, Edinburgh	Hugh Hodgart	play by Anton Chekov, adapted by Stuart Paterson
