= Pauline Knowles =

Scottish actress and singer (1967–2018)

- In A Slow Air, 2014
- Born: 16 December 1967; Edinburgh, Scotland
- Died: 17 October 2018 (aged 50); Glasgow, Scotland
- Education: Royal Conservatoire of Scotland
- Occupation: Actress
- Years active: 1990–2018
- Awards: Critics Award, Scotland

Pauline Knowles (16 December 1967 – 17 October 2018) was a Scottish actress and singer known for her work in theatre. She was referred to as "one of the most powerful stage actresses of her generation".

== Early life ==
Pauline Knowles was born on 16 December 1967 in Edinburgh, Scotland, the 12th of 13 children. She attended Holy Rood High School, and after one year at Stirling University, she transferred to the Royal Conservatoire of Scotland (formerly known as the Royal Scottish Academy of Music and Drama.)

== Career ==
Knowles made her professional debut in 1990, in the play John Brown's Body, by John McGrath. She appeared in major theatres across Scotland, including the Lyceum Theatre, Traverse Theatre, Theatre Babel and the Citizens Theatre. Her theatre work includes Don Juan (Pen-Name Theatre Company}), Vodka and Daisies (Annexe Theatre Company), Cleaning Up and Shanks (Wildcat), Jump the Life to Come and Antigone (7:84), and Cuttin' a Rug and School for Wives (Lyceum Theatre, Edinburgh).

She also appeared in musicals such as Man of La Mancha; David Shrigley’s ‘sort-of-opera’, Pass the Spoon; and a chamber opera, The Garden, by John and Zinnie Harris.

Her television credits include John Brown's Body for Channel 4, Taggart for Scottish Television and the second series of Strathblair for the BBC. Radio credits include Floating for Radio 4.

== Selected Theatre ==
Year	Title	Role	Theatre	Director	Notes
1993	A Scots Quair	Chris Guthrie	Assembly Hall, Edinburgh	Tony Graham	Alasdair Cording's adaptation of Lewis Grassic Gibbon's trilogy
1995	Knives In Hens	Young Woman	Traverse Theatre, Edinburgh	Philip Howard	The original production of David Harrower's modern classic
1998	Heritage	Sarah	Traverse Theatre, Edinburgh	Richard Baron	The original production of Nicola McCartney's modern classic.
1999	The Speculator	Colombe	Traverse Theatre, Edinburgh		David Greig's "rambunctious costume drama"
2014	A Slow Air	Morna	Scottish Tour	David Harrower	Revival of David Harrower's play originally staged in 2011. Produced by Borderline theatre company.
2016	Jumpy	Hilary	Lyceum Theatre, Edinburgh	Cora Bissett	Written by April De Angelis.
2016	This Restless House	Clytemnestra	Citizens Theatre, Glasgow	Dominic Hill	Zinnie Harris's adaptation of Aeschylus’s Oresteia trilogy
2018	The Belle's Stratagem	Mrs. Racket	Lyceum Theatre, Edinburgh	Tony Cownie	Tony Cownie's adaptation of Hannah Cowley's play

== Personal life and death ==
Knowles was in a relationship with Angus Gray; they first met in the 2000s, when she sent a text message intended for her brother-in-law, but he had recently changed his number, and the message was instead received by Gray. They became engaged in 2017, and intended to marry in 2019, but Knowles died from a heart attack on 17 October 2018, at her home in Glasgow.

In 2019, the Royal Conservatoire of Scotland established the Pauline Knowles Scholarship Fund in her honour, to support Scottish or Scottish-based BA acting students at the start of their careers.

== Awards ==
In 2016, Knowles won a Critics' Award for Theatre in Scotland, as Best Female Performance in the role of Clytemnestra, in This Restless House, a play by Zinnie Harris based on the Oresteia. She gained the Best Performer award at the Adelaide festival in Australia after appearing in "Fleeto and Wee Andy".
