= The Gladiators (novel) =

Novel by Arthur Koestler

- First edition (publ. Jonathan Cape)
- Author: Arthur Koestler
- Language: English
- Publication date: 1939

The Gladiators (1939) is the first novel by the author Arthur Koestler; it portrays the effects of the Spartacus revolt in the Roman Republic. Published in 1939, it was later reprinted in other editions.

== Introduction ==
The book is the first of a trilogy, including Darkness at Noon (1940), and Arrival and Departure (1943), which address idealism going wrong. This is a common theme in Koestler's work and life. Koestler uses his portrayal of the original slave revolt to examine the experience of the 20th-century political left in Europe following the rise of a Communist government in the Soviet Union. He published it on the brink of World War II.

Originally written in German, the novel was translated into English and published in 1939 in the UK. This edition was translated by the German-born British writer and artist Edith Simon. The manuscript of the German version, for which no publisher had been found, was lost during Koestler's flight at the Fall of France; the German edition finally published after the war had to be re-translated from English.

In 1998 the British critic Geoffrey Wheatcroft wrote of the novel: "In The Gladiators, Koestler used Spartacus's revolt around 65 BC to explore the search for the just city, the inevitable compromises of revolution, the conflict of ends and means, the question of whether and when it is justifiable to sacrifice lives for an abstract ideal."

== Plot ==
In 73 BCE, forty gladiators escape from the school at Capua belonging to Lentulus Batiatus. Armed with stolen weapons and armour, they flee southwards and engage in a vengeful campaign of plunder and killing. Dozens of followers are attracted to their cause, including runaway slaves, freemen, idealistic townsfolk, and even entire families. Leadership falls nominally to Spartacus, a Thracian ex-soldier, and his friend Crixus, a Gaul tribesman.

Spartacus and Crixus work to turn the mob into a proper army, knowing that the Roman Senate will not tolerate their insurrection. They eventually retire to a more defensible position on Mount Vesuvius and obtain a major victory when they defeat a sizeable force of Roman militia sent to crush them. Still largely directionless, they move south into the Campania region, looting numerous towns to support themselves.

The rebels eventually divide into two large groups: Crixus and his followers head north to attack Rome itself. They are easily bested by the Senate's legions, and those not killed in battle are crucified along the Appian Way. Crixus, however, survives and manages to rejoin Spartacus, now humbled and willing to follow his command. They establish a camp outside the coastal city of Thurium. The inhabitants, largely descendants from Greek colonists conquered by Rome, are sympathetic to the rebels and feed them.

Spartacus, now styling himself Imperator, negotiates a truce with the ruling council of Thurium; the threat of his army coerces the councilors to grant the rebels all of their demands. They commence the building of the "Sun City", a new settlement where everyone is equal in rank, all goods are shared, and all work for the common good. Spartacus enforces new laws with harsh discipline. Fulvius, a former lawyer, commences to write a chronicle of the rebellion (which is never completed), and becomes the main political advisor to Spartacus.

With a growing and prosperous population, they receive emissaries from other polities and negotiate treaties and trade relations, even with the ruthless pirates that rule the nearby seas. Spartacus also tries to inspire more slave revolts throughout Roman territory but is largely unsuccessful. The situation grows more dire when Roman naval fleets manage to blockade the Sun City, cutting the rebels off from their allies and limiting their ability to sustain themselves. Doubts begin to arise as to Spartacus' handling of the city's affairs.

Upon learning that an attack has been carried out against the city of Metapontum, thus ruining his attempts at diplomacy, Spartacus has the surviving attackers crucified. Word arrives that the wealthy senator Crassus will soon arrive with eight legions. Spartacus resorts to bribing the pirates for passage to Sicily; the pirates then quickly sail away after lying to him about needing to prepare their ships. The rebels finally depart on foot, leaving the Sun City to burn rather than let the Romans capture it. A group led by Crixus sacrifice themselves to hold back Crassus. Spartacus tries to negotiate an honourable surrender, but the senator is eager for glory and refuses.

With no choice left, Spartacus and his army prepare for their last stand. Most, including Spartacus himself, are slain. The survivors, nearly six thousand in number, are crucified on Crassus' order along the road he and his legions take as they return to Rome victorious.

== Reception ==
The novel is generally not as well known to English-speaking audiences as the later American novel on this topic, Spartacus (1951), by Howard Fast, a bestseller adapted for Stanley Kubrick's award-winning 1960 film of the same name, which reached wide audiences and stimulated sales of Fast's novel.

== See also ==
- Copy of Book on the Internet Archive. 1914.
- Spartacus (1951) novel by Howard Fast, which was adapted for the 1960 film.
- Spartacus, 1931 novel by the Scottish writer Lewis Grassic Gibbon.
