= Holy Rood High School, Edinburgh =

Holy Rood RC High School
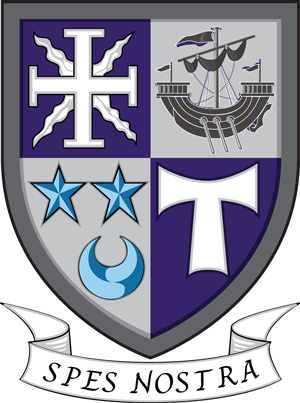

Location
- Duddingston Road West; Edinburgh, EH15 1ST; Scotland; 55.94131°N 3.14237°W

Information
- Type: Secondary
- Motto: Spes Nostra (Our Hope)
- Religious affiliation: Catholicism
- Established: 1971
- Local authority: City of Edinburgh
- Department for Education URN: 5533031 Tables
- Headteacher: Joan Daly
- Deputy Headteachers: Martin Connolly, Fiona Forbes, Chris Moore, Derek Ferguson
- Gender: Mixed
- Age: 11 to 18
- Website: http://www.holyroodrchighschool.co.uk/

Holy Rood High School is a Roman Catholic secondary school situated on the edge of Holyrood Park, near Arthur's Seat beside Duddingston Village, in Edinburgh, Scotland. It is about half a mile a way from Castlebrae Community High School.

== Headteacher and senior leadership team ==
The headteacher is Joan Daly. She is assisted by depute headteachers Martin Connelly, Fiona Forbes, James Campbell, business manager Linsey McKay and senior development officer Michael Scott. Dennis Canavan is a former Assistant Head.

== History ==
The original Holy Rood RC High School was opened in 1971, when it replaced St Anthony's Secondary School.

The current school building was officially opened in September 2009 with the original 1970s build being demolished.

On the 4th April 2025, rapper JAAD and influencer Caz Milligan showed up outside the school gate and began rapping on top of a car. No one knew that this was going to happen. They handed out pizza to students and filmed videos, which have since been taken down from YouTube and TikTok.

== Admissions ==
The school has a current pupil roll of approximately 1050 pupils and 80 teaching staff.

== Alumni ==
- Pauline Knowles (1967-2018), actress and singer
- Lewis Vaughan (born 1995), footballer
