= Three Go Back =

1932 novel by J. Leslie Mitchell

Three Go Back is a novel by J. Leslie Mitchell (known by his pseudonym Lewis Grassic Gibbon) published in 1932.

== Plot summary ==
Three Go Back is a novel in which an airship goes back in time 25,000 years and the passengers encounter Cro-Magnons and Neanderthals.

== Reception ==
Dave Langford reviewed Three Go Back for White Dwarf #79, and stated that "it's a pleasant novel, and reminds you that while American magazine heroes were zapping greenskins with their blasters, some 1930s authors still considered SF a literature of ideas."

== Reviews ==
- Review by C. A. Brandt (1932) in Amazing Stories, August 1932
- Review by Bill Collins (1986) in Fantasy Review, July-August 1986
- Review by Chris Morgan (1986) in Fantasy Review, July-August 1986
- Review by Edward James (1986) in Vector 134
- Review by Don D'Ammassa (1987) in Science Fiction Chronicle, #91 April 1987
