= Scobie in September =

British television series

- Genre: Thriller
- Written by: Bill Craig
- Directed by: Pharic Maclaren
- Starring: Maurice Roëves; Hannah Gordon
- Country of origin: United Kingdom
- Original language: English
- No. of series: 1
- No. of episodes: 6

Production
- Producer: Pharic Maclaren
- Running time: 30 minutes
- Production company: BBC

Original release
- Network: BBC 1
- Release: 14 January – 18 February 1969

Scobie in September is a 1969 thriller television series that originally aired on BBC 1 in 1969. It takes place around the Edinburgh Festival. Bill Craig wrote a spin-off novel of the same title.

== Cast ==
- Maurice Roëves as Scobie
- Hannah Gordon as Judy
- Anton Diffring as Pandorus
- David Langton as Sir James Thorne
- Bryden Murdoch as Munro
- Garfield Morgan as Slackhand
- John Grieve as Sergeant Turner
- Gerard Heinz as Pereira
- Anne Kristen as Lilli
- Anthony Valentine as Vickers
- Hugh Evans as Brodie
- Fulton Mackay as The Watchmaker
- Helena Gloag as Mrs Geary
- Alex McAvoy as Archie

== Bibliography ==
- Baskin, Ellen . Serials on British Television, 1950-1994. Scolar Press, 1996.
