= Bill Craig (writer) =

British writer

Bill Craig (28 February 1930 – 19 July 2002) was a Scottish television scriptwriter.

He wrote many programmes, including the TV adaptations of The Vital Spark, Sunset Song, Cloud Howe, Grey Granite and The Eagle of the Ninth. He wrote the 1969 BBC thriller Scobie in September.

He also wrote for the BBC's Compact soap opera and The Borderers with Iain Cuthbertson as the warden.

Glasgow's Mitchell Library holds a collection relating to Craig, including rehearsal scripts of his screen adaptation of Sunset Song, letters and newspaper cuttings. These can all be viewed by making an appointment with the library's Special Collections Department.
