= A Scots Quair =

Trilogy by Lewis Grassic Gibbon

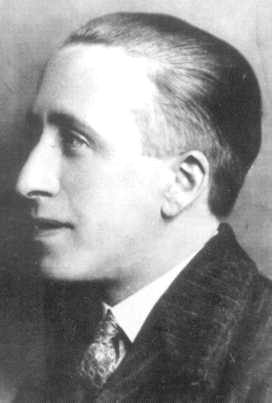
Lewis Grassic Gibbon

A Scots Quair is a trilogy by the Scottish writer Lewis Grassic Gibbon, describing the life of Chris Guthrie, a woman from the north-east of Scotland during the early 20th century.

It consists of three novels: Sunset Song (1932), Cloud Howe (1933), and Grey Granite (1934). The first is widely regarded as an important classic (voted Scotland's favourite book in a 2005 poll supported by the Scottish Book Trust and other organisations).

== Sunset Song ==
The central character is a young woman, Chris Guthrie, growing up in a farming family in the fictional community of Kinraddie in The Mearns (Kincardineshire) in north-east Scotland at the start of the 20th century. Life is hard, and her family is dysfunctional. She marries a farmer, Ewan Tavendale, who dies in World War I.

== Cloud Howe ==
Cloud Howe continues the story of Chris Guthrie. She marries for a second time to Robert Colquhoun, a Church of Scotland minister. At the end of the novel, he dies in the pulpit while delivering a sermon.

== Grey Granite ==
Grey Granite takes the story of Chris Guthrie further. She moves to the fictional city of Duncairn, which was earlier called "Dundon" in Cloud Howe; Gibbon points out in the introduction that Dundon/Duncairn is based neither on Aberdeen nor on Dundee (as some reviewers had surmised) but is "merely the city which the inhabitants of The Mearns (not foreseeing my requirements in completing my trilogy) have hitherto failed to build". An important character is her son by her first marriage, Ewan Tavendale, Jr., who becomes a left-wing political activist.

== Adaptations ==
TV adaptations of all three works were made by the BBC in 1971, 1982 and 1983, respectively. They were scripted by Bill Craig, and Vivien Heilbron played Chris.

An adaptation of the trilogy by Alastair Cording was produced by TAG Theatre Company in 1991 and staged again at the Assembly Hall during the 1993 Edinburgh International Festival, with Pauline Knowles in the role of Chris Guthrie.
