= The Borderers =

British TV drama series (1968–1970)

- Genre: Drama
- Created by: Bill Craig
- Starring: Michael Gambon; Edith MacArthur; Iain Cuthbertson; Ross Campbell; Margaret Greig
- Country of origin: Scotland
- No. of series: 2
- No. of episodes: 26 (11 missing)

Production
- Producers: Peter Graham Scott; Anthony Coburn

Original release
- Network: BBC Two
- Release: 31 December 1968 – 31 March 1970

The Borderers is a British television series set in the Scottish Borders produced by the BBC between 1968 and 1970.

== Setting ==
A historical drama series, The Borderers was set during the 16th century and chronicled the lives of the Ker family, who lived in the Scottish Middle March on the frontier between England and Scotland. Some episodes of the show depict the wider politics, mostly as it affects their relative Sir Walter Ker, warden of the Middle March/

The series was described by The Guardian in 2007 as "brave and original...a kind of north-eastern western". It shows an ordinary family trying to live as part of a society of Border Reivers, a world where raid and feud were unavoidable parts of daily life. The wars between England and Scotland had destroyed the normal processes of law enforcement. The setting is a particularly tense time, with Elizabeth of England and Mary, Queen of Scots, in competition. Also the struggle between Protestants and Catholics in both kingdoms. Amidst all this, the Kers of Slitrig are trying to live an ordinary life.

The leading cast members are Iain Cuthbertson, Edith MacArthur and Michael Gambon.

Series 1 was produced by Peter Graham Scott, who had worked on The Avengers, Mogul, The Troubleshooters and would later go on to make The Onedin Line.

Series 2 was produced by Anthony Coburn who had previously worked on Doctor Who.

In 2007, two episodes of The Borderers were part of the BBC Archive Trial.

== Cast ==
The regular cast were Michael Gambon as Gavin Ker (male head of the family), Edith MacArthur as Margaret Ker and Iain Cuthbertson as Sir Walter Ker of Cessford. Nell Brennan as Agnes Ker (Series 1) and Eileen Nicholas as Agnes Ker (Series 2). Margaret Greig as Grizel Ker, Joseph Brady as Rab (Series 1) and James Garbutt as Rab (Series 2). Ross Campbell as Jamie Ker and Russell Waters as Pringle (Cessford's clerk). Sir Walter Ker is a real historical figure, though little is known of him and most of what is shown in the series is invented.

== Episodes ==
Of the show's 26 episodes, only 15 survive today, mainly from series 1, with 7 existing in their original colour format, the other 8 existing as black and white telerecordings.

Series	Episodes	Originally released	
Series	Episodes	First released	Last released
1	13	31 December 1968	25 March 1969
2	13	6 January 1970	31 March 1970

=== Series 1 (1968–69) ===
No. overall	No. in series	Title	Written by	Produced by	Original release date	Archive status
1	1	"Vengeance"	Bill Craig	Peter Graham Scott	31 December 1968	Exists in colour
The elder of the Ker family, Gavin, has a shattering experience in front of him when he seeks a wider world.
2	2	"Truce"	Bill Craig	Peter Graham Scott	7 January 1969	16mm black-and-white film print exists
When Gavin leads his men across the border to seek Agnes, he is accused of murdering an Englishman.
3	3	"Witch Hunt"	Vincent Tilsley	Peter Graham Scott	14 January 1969	16mm black-and-white film print exists
Gavin's younger sister Grizel is put on trial for being a witch. (This episode was given a Radio Times cover.)
4	4	"Treason"	Jack Ronder	Peter Graham Scott	21 January 1969	16mm black-and-white film print exists
A friend visits Gavin who tries to persuade him to travel to Europe. But when pilgrims arrive, he is caught up in religious turmoil of the era.
5	5	"Fugitive"	Allan Prior	Peter Graham Scott	28 January 1969	16mm black-and-white film print exists
An English fugitive saves Gavin's life, but is soon compromised when he gives him shelter.
6	6	"Stranger"	Bill Craig	Peter Graham Scott	4 February 1969	16mm black-and-white film print exists
Gavin has a rival, when a David Scott claims to be the real Laird of Slitrig.
7	7	"Hero"	Jack Ronder	Peter Graham Scott	11 February 1969	Missing
Cessford lies wounded at Slitrig after an assassination attempt by John Hume.
8	8	"Bloodfeud"	George F Kerr	Peter Graham Scott	18 February 1969	16mm black-and-white film print exists
The Kers' arguments with the Armstrongs lead Jamie to be accused of murdering one of them.
9	9	"Giant"	Eve Martell	Peter Graham Scott	25 February 1969	Missing
Gavin must sneak into England to rescue a Scottish spy.
10	10	"Wedlock"	Sean Hignett	Peter Graham Scott	4 March 1969	Missing
The Scotts of Branxholm raise Gavin's wrath when they boast openly of stealing the warden's cattle.
11	11	"Outlaw"	Bruce Stewart	Peter Graham Scott	11 March 1969	16mm black-and-white film print exists
When the Telfers, friends of the Kers, are evicted for debt, they desperately seek religious justification for the only option open to them: stealing.
12	12	"Justice"	John Lucarotti	Peter Graham Scott	18 March 1969	16mm black-and-white film print exists
A young Italian physician, Mario Vecchi, seeks refuge with the Kers, when he fails to save a patient's life, and the Armstrongs seek vengeance.
13	13	"Dispossessed"	Julian Nees	Peter Graham Scott	25 March 1969	Exists in colour
An English princess is taken hostage, while on the way to marry a Scot she detests. Guest starring John Thaw and Vivien Heilbron.

=== Series 2 (1970) ===
No. overall	No. in series	Title	Written by	Produced by	Original release date	Archive status
14	1	"The Siege of Cocklaws"	Jan Read	Anthony Coburn	6 January 1970	Exists in colour
The English attack a castle owned by the Laird of Cocklaws, Gavin defends him, whilst knowing his motives are a sham. Guest starring William Hurndell and Hilda Braid.
15	2	"Survival Day"	George F Kerr	Anthony Coburn	13 January 1970	Exists in colour
The Kers believe a cattle buyer is in league with Cessford to rob them of their living.
16	3	"Snatch"	Jan Read	Anthony Coburn	20 January 1970	Exists in colour
Agnes Ker is snatched by a gypsy, Hector Faa. Gavin must fight Hector and Agnes to get her back.
17	4	"What a Vengeance Upon England"	Anthony Steven	Anthony Coburn	27 January 1970	Missing
Cessford tries to marry off his troublesome ward to an English warden. The romance turns lethal and is complicated by an Arab stallion.
18	5	"Among the Eagles"	Bill Craig	Anthony Coburn	3 February 1970	Missing
Cessford is involved in a charge of treason when he attempts to uncover a traitor at the court of Queen Mary. (This episode was given a Radio Times cover.)
19	6	"Plot Counterplot"	Anthony Coburn	Anthony Coburn	10 February 1970	Missing
Cessford travels to Edinburgh seeking promotion, only to end up with dismissal and disgrace.
20	7	"The Quacksalver"	Roy Russell	Anthony Coburn	17 February 1970	Missing
The Quacksalvers trick their way into Slitrig, and Gavin has to decide whether they should be pitied or are rogues.
21	8	"To the Gallows Tree"	Martin Worth	Anthony Coburn	24 February 1970	Missing
Gavin defends his bonded tenant against torture and a monstrous charge.
22	9	"A Woman or an Epitaph"	Bruce Stewart	Anthony Coburn	3 March 1970	Missing
A woman called "The Wee Daftie" changes men's opinions on the role of women in society.
23	10	"Hostage"	Tom Wright	Anthony Coburn	10 March 1970	Missing
A boy is to be hanged within three days if stolen beasts are not returned.
24	11	"Where the White Lilies Grow"	Martin Worth	Anthony Coburn	17 March 1970	Exists in colour
Cessford's son brings a new bride and murder with him to Cessford Castle.
25	12	"The Terror of the March"	Martin Worth	Anthony Coburn	24 March 1970	Missing
Cessford has a hugely powerful cannon, which to the surprise of everyone, finds itself at the bottom of Slitrig Loch.
26	13	"The Sea-Cole Man"	Morris Farhi	Anthony Coburn	31 March 1970	Exists in colour
To settle the feud between the Kers and the Johnstones, a wrestling match is arranged.
