= The Nightmare Man (TV series) =

1981 British TV sci-fi drama series

- The Nightmare Man UK DVD release.
- Genre: Science fiction drama
- Created by: Robert Holmes; David Wiltshire (novel)
- Directed by: Douglas Camfield
- Starring: James Warwick; Celia Imrie; Maurice Roëves; Jonathan Newth; James Cosmo
- Country of origin: United Kingdom
- No. of episodes: 4

Production
- Producer: Ron Craddock
- Running time: 30 minutes

Original release
- Network: BBC1
- Release: 1 May – 22 May 1981

The Nightmare Man is a science fiction drama serial transmitted by BBC Television in 1981. The four-part drama was adapted for television by Robert Holmes from the 1978 novel Child of Vodyanoi by David Wiltshire. It was produced by Ron Craddock (a former producer of Z-Cars) and directed by Douglas Camfield. Both Holmes and Camfield had worked extensively on Doctor Who.

The serial is set on a small Scottish island, where the population is gripped by fear following a series of savage murders and the discovery of a strange craft on the local beach.

== Cast ==
- James Warwick as Michael Gaffkin
- Celia Imrie as Fiona Patterson
- Tony Sibbald as Dr Symonds
- Maurice Roëves as Inspector Inskip
- Jonathan Newth as Colonel Howard
- Tom Watson as Dr Goudry
- James Cosmo as Sergeant Carch
- Fraser Wilson as P.C. Malcolmson
- Elaine Wells as Mrs McKay
- Robert Vowles as Lt Carey
- Jeff Stewart as Drummond
- Jon Croft as McGrath
- Ronald Forfar as Campbell

== Production ==
The serial was shot in and around the Cornish village of Port Isaac. It was made entirely using outside broadcasting video facilities.

== Release ==
The serial has been released on DVD (Region 2, UK) by BBC Worldwide as part of their Cult TV range. The DVD included a booklet detailing the serial's background and production.
