= Edith Simon =

German-British artist and author

- Born: 18 May 1917; Berlin, Germany
- Died: 7 January 2003 (aged 85); Edinburgh, United Kingdom
- Education: Slade School of Fine Art, Central School of Art and Design
- Organization: Artists' International Association (founding member)
- Known for: Artist, author, translator
- Spouse: Eric Reeve
- Children: 3
- Website: edith-simon.com

Edith Simon (18 May 1917 – 7 January 2003) was a German-born British artist, author, sculptor, and historian active mainly in Edinburgh.

== Early life ==
Simon was born on 18 May 1917 in Charlottenburg, Berlin, the eldest daughter of Grete and Walter Simon. Her father was a decorated artillery officer in the German Army in World War I. Simon attended the Fürstin-Bismarck Gymnasium, where she excelled at art and history. A Berlin newspaper published her art and writing starting at the age of 10.

Her parents were agnostic Jews and, recognising the threat from the Nazis, left Germany in 1931 to avoid further persecution and settled in London. Simon followed them to London in 1931. Rather than complete her studies in England (she had yet to fully master the English language), Simon returned briefly to Germany to complete her Reifezeugnis (the German equivalent of English A-levels). While staying with relatives in Düsseldorf, her cousin took her to visit the renowned Kunstakademie Düsseldorf. Experiencing the atmosphere at the Akademie, the seriousness of the art teaching, and the progressiveness of the modern art being created made an impression on the young Simon.

== Writing ==
Over the years Simon wrote 17 novels, historical fiction, and non-fiction books on a range of topics, and contributed to many others. In 1937, she wrote and illustrated a children's story Somersaults and Strange Company published under the nom de plume 'Edith'. Her second publication in 1939 was a translation, from German into English, of Arthur Koestler's first novel The Gladiators. In 1940 she published her own first novel, The Chosen, which received good reviews. She went on to write several more novels, including The Piebald Standard (1959), based on the history of the Knights Templar. She then turned her attention to two biographies – Luther Alive (1962) about Martin Luther and his role and influence in the Reformation, and The Making of Frederick The Great (1961). Her biography of Frederick the Great was translated in to German, and is still in use today.

Simon gave up writing books when the publisher Lord Wedenfield refused to publish her novel about the assassination of Queen Elizabeth II, being concerned about the controversy and offence it might cause.

== Art ==
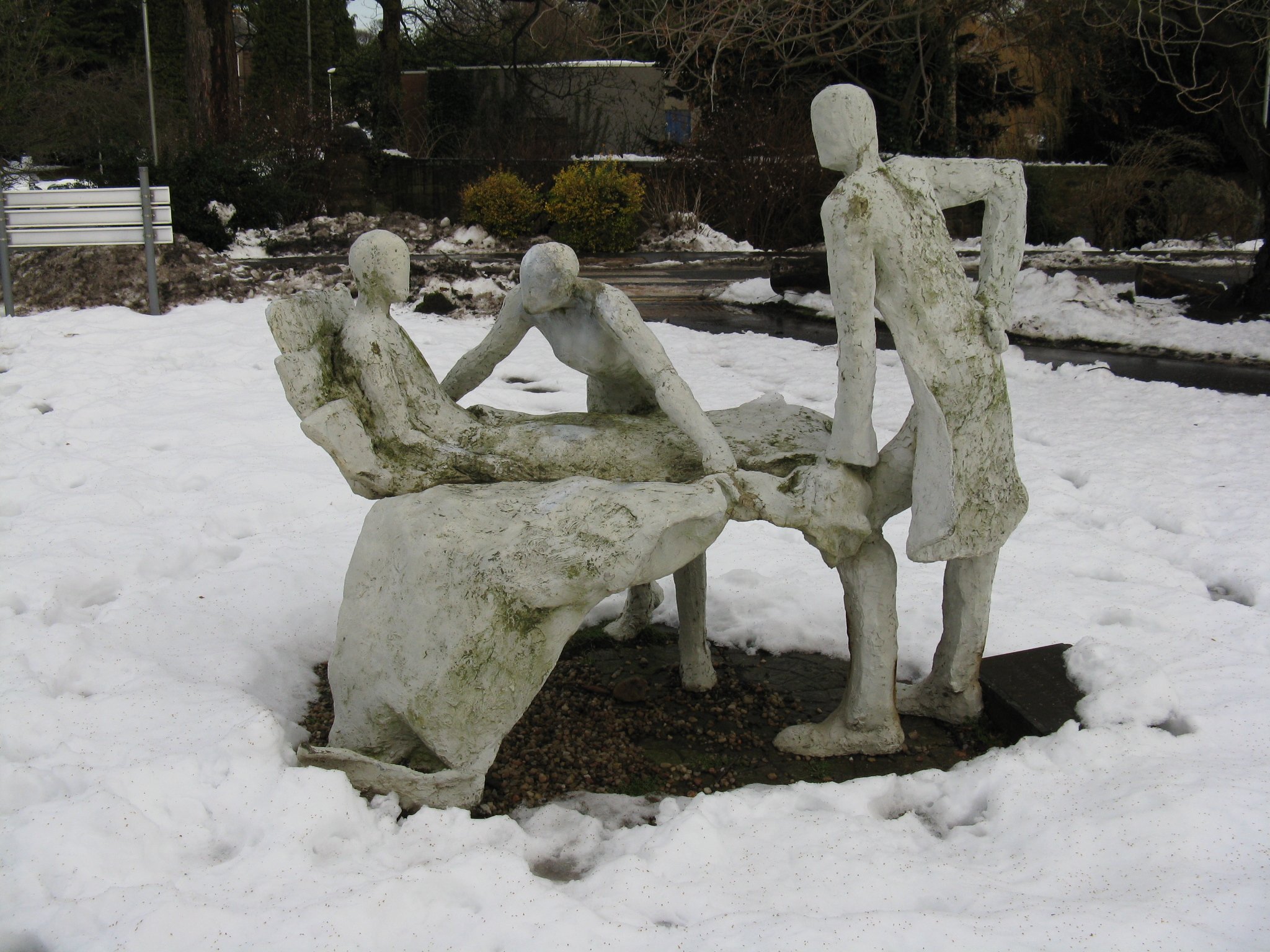
Health Service at the Astley Ainslie Hospital in Edinburgh

At the age of 16 Simon studied for a short time at the Slade School of Fine Art and then the Central School of Art and Design, before working as an illustrator of books. Her focus turned away from art for many years, but she returned to it in 1970 and continued until her death in 2003. in the 1980s she made intricate "scalpel paintings" from paper. Every year from 1970 to 2001 she exhibited during the annual Edinburgh Festival Fringe. Her work was described by artist John Bellany as "Fearless Vigour".

In 1933 she was one of the founding members of the Artists' International Association.

== Personal life ==
Simon met the geneticist Dr. Eric Reeve at a party in London in 1942, and they married later that year. They moved to Edinburgh in 1947 when Reeve took a position at the Institute of Animal Genetics at the University of Edinburgh. Together the couple had three children, Antonia, who became a professional photographer, Simon, and Jay.

Her home in Edinburgh's New Town was the venue for many parties.

She died in Edinburgh on 7 January 2003. Her obituary in The Scotsman newspaper described her as having "considerable intellectual power, literary gifts, charm and a mordant wit. She was striking in appearance, trenchant in her views and generous to the young and those in need".

Her archive is held in the collections of National Library of Scotland.

== Works ==
- The Adventures of the Little Pig and Other Stories (1937) – as illustrator
- Somersaults and Strange Company (1937)
- The Gladiators (1939) – as translator
- The Chosen (1940)
- Biting the Blue Finger (1942)
- Wings Deceive (1944)
- The Other Passion (1948)
- The Golden Hand (1952)
- The House of Strangers (1953)
- The Past Masters (1953)
- The Twelve Pictures (1956)
- The Sable Coat (1958)
- The Piebald Standard: A Biography of the Knights Templars (1959)
- The Great Forgery (1962)
- The Making of Frederick the Great (1963)
- Luther Alive: Martin Luther and the Making of the Reformation (1968)
- The Saints (1968)
- The Anglo Saxon Manner: The English Contribution to Civilization (1972)
- "Martin Luther" in The Horizon Book of Makers of Modern Thought (1972)
- "Frederick II the Great of Prussia" in Encyclopædia Britannica (1974 edition) – as contributor
- Health Service sculpture in the grounds of the Astley Ainslie Hospital, Edinburgh
