= Arrival and Departure =

1943 novel by Arthur Koestler

- First edition (UK)
- Author: Arthur Koestler
- Language: English
- Published: 1943
- Publisher: Jonathan Cape (UK); Macmillan (US)
- Media type: Print
- Preceded by: Darkness at Noon

Arrival and Departure (1943) is the third novel of Arthur Koestler's trilogy concerning the conflict between morality and expedience (as described in the postscript to the novel's 1966 Danube Edition). The first volume, The Gladiators, is about the subversion of the Spartacus revolt, and the second, Darkness at Noon, is the celebrated novel about the Soviet show trials. Arrival and Departure was Koestler's first full-length work in English, The Gladiators and Darkness at Noon having originally been written in German. It is often considered to be the weakest of the three.

In a December 1943 review, George Orwell wrote, "As a novel this book does not succeed.... But as an allegory it does succeed" and "is also notable for what must be one of the most shocking descriptions of Nazi terrorism that have ever been written". Yet in 1944 Orwell concluded that "Arrival and Departure is not a satisfactory book. The pretence that it is a novel is very thin; in effect it is a tract purporting to show that revolutionary creeds are rationalisations of neurotic impulses".

In a November 1943 review, Saul Bellow wrote that Arrival and Departure "raises the following questions: When we have succeeded in understanding what it is in the growth of our minds, our early histories, that drives us to serve causes, is it then proper for us to abandon those causes? What if it is proved to us that our hunger for justice is a sign of neurosis, are we absolved from our responsibility for justice? Is it a sign of health to seek satisfaction for one's self and of morbidity to recognize and obligation to ethical values?"

== Plot ==
Written during the middle of World War II, Arrival and Departure reflects Koestler's own plight as a Hungarian refugee. Like Koestler, the main character, Peter Slavek, is a former member of the Communist party. He escapes to "Neutralia," a neutral country based on Portugal, where Koestler himself had gone, and flees from there. (Harold Rosenberg wrote in a book review in Partisan Review that "there ought to be a law against such place-names.") Reflecting Koestler's later relationship with science and particularly his disagreement with various movements within psychiatry, the main character emerges from treatment psychically neutered, and the critical question of the novel is how much of his later trauma and political activity is due to a small incident in his childhood.
