= Scum of the Earth (book) =

1941 memoir by Arthur Koestler

- First edition
- Author: Arthur Koestler
- Language: English
- Genre: Autobiography
- Publisher: Jonathan Cape
- Publication date: 1941
- Pages: 250

Scum of the Earth is a memoir by Anglo-Hungarian writer Arthur Koestler in which he describes his life in France during 1939-1940, the chaos that prevailed in France just prior to the outbreak of the Second World War and France’s collapse, his tribulations, internment in a concentration camp, and eventual escape to England, via North Africa and Portugal. It was first published by Jonathan Cape in 1941.

== Background ==
At the outbreak of the Second World War, Koestler was living in the South of France working on Darkness at Noon. After retreating to Paris he was imprisoned by the French as an undesirable alien, even though he had been a respected anti-fascist. Koestler arrived in England in December 1940, without an entry permit, travelling with a Hungarian passport. Although he was by then widely known as an anti-fascist he was imprisoned as an enemy alien while his case was being reviewed by the Home Office. While he was in Pentonville Prison in London, his novel Darkness at Noon was being published in England. It would become his most influential and well-known book.

Upon his release in January 1941, Koestler immediately enlisted in the British Army. Over the following three months, while waiting for his call-up papers and army posting, he wrote Scum of the Earth. The book was well received and had glowing reviews.

This was the first book that Koestler wrote in English. In the preface to the 1955 edition, after explaining the circumstances under which the book was written, he acknowledges the book’s shortcomings:

Re-reading the book for the first time after thirteen years, I find these outer and inner pressures reflected in its apocalyptic mood, its spontaneity and lack of polish. Some pages now appear insufferably maudlin: others are studded with clichés which at the time, however, seemed original discoveries to the innocent explorer of a new language-continent; above all the text betrays the fact that there had been no time for correcting proofs. To remedy these faults would mean to re-write the book, and that would be a pointless undertaking – for, if the book has any value, it lies in its documentary period character. I have confined myself to correcting only the most glaring Gallicisms, germanisms and grammatical errors – and to throwing out adjectives and similes at a set rate of one in five.

== Reception ==
Scum earned several positive reviews:

“A memorable story, vivid, powerful and deeply searching” – The Times Literary Supplement

“This is a book in a thousand, by far the best book to come out of the collapse of France” – The Guardian

“Koestler’s personal history of France at War. It is, I think, the finest book that has come out of that cauldron” – New York Herald Tribune
