= Sunset Song =

1932 novel by Lewis Grassic Gibbon

- First edition (US)
- Author: Lewis Grassic Gibbon
- Language: English and Scots
- Series: A Scots Quair trilogy
- Genre: Novel
- Publisher: Jarrolds Publishing (UK); The Century Company (US)
- Publication date: 1932
- Publication place: Scotland
- Media type: Print (hardback and paperback)
- Followed by: Cloud Howe

Sunset Song is a 1932 novel by Scottish writer Lewis Grassic Gibbon. It is considered one of the most important Scottish novels of the 20th century and is the first part of the trilogy A Scots Quair. There have been several adaptations, including a 1971 television series by BBC Scotland, a 2015 film version, and some stage versions.

== Plot introduction ==
The central character is a young woman, Chris Guthrie, growing up in a farming family in the fictional parish of Kinraddie in the Mearns at the start of the 20th century. Life is hard, and her family is dysfunctional.

== Plot summary ==
Chris Guthrie's mother, broken by repeated childbirths and learning she is again pregnant, kills her baby twins and herself. Two younger children go to live with their aunt and uncle in Aberdeen, leaving Chris, her older brother Will, and her father to run the farm on their own. Will and his father have a stormy relationship; and Will emigrates to Argentina with his young bride, Mollie Douglas. Chris is left to do his work as well as her own. Soon after this, her father suffers a stroke, leaving him bedridden. For a time, he tries to persuade her to commit incest with him; but she ignores his pleas. He dies shortly afterwards. At his funeral, Chris realises how hard her father had worked and breaks down in tears, regretting their broken relationship.

Chris, who has had some education, considers leaving for a job as a teacher in the towns but realises she loves the land and cannot leave it. Instead, she marries a young farmer called Ewan Tavendale and they manage the croft together. For a time, they are happily married, and they have a son, whom they also call Ewan. When the First World War begins, many young men from the district join up, and Chris's husband eventually gives in to peer pressure. When he comes home on leave, he is brutalised by his experiences in the army and treats Chris badly. After receiving news of his death in action, Chris hears from a fellow-crofter, Chae Strachan, who is home on leave, that Ewan was shot as a deserter because he longed to return home to her and make things right. She begins a relationship with the new minister, and she watches as he dedicates the War Memorial at the Standing Stones above her home. The Sun sets to the Flowers of the Forest, bringing an end to their way of life, forever.

== Major themes ==
The novel touches on several issues; the distinctive, not always positive character, of small rural communities in the North East of Scotland, the role of women, and the "peasant crisis" i.e. the coming of modernisation to traditional farming communities. The theme of the onset of modernisation and the end of old ways is explored using many symbols, for example, violent deaths of horses (supposed to represent old, traditional farming methods) and the appearance of motorised cars representing new technologies which brush the people of the land from the road. The author also has some political opinions reflected in the characters of Chae Strachan, the Socialist, and Long Rob, the pacifist, and he shows how they react to the coming of the war. The dilemma Chris faces over whether to continue her education or commit to a life in the land is also featured. The title of the novel is a direct reference to the theme of the sunset of the old ways and traditions. By some readings Chris is "Chris Caledonia", an allegorical figure for Scotland.

== Literary significance and criticism ==
When it was first published, some readers were shocked by its realistic treatment of sex and childbirth and its sometimes negative portrayals of family life. Some wondered if it had been written by a woman using a male pseudonym. The novel is written in an essentially artificial form of Scots intended to capture the colloquial speech of The Mearns peasants without being inaccessible to English speakers. Sunset Song has often been voted one of the greatest Scottish novels. In 2016, the book topped a BBC poll to find "Scotland's Favourite Book". The former First Minister of Scotland Nicola Sturgeon has named it as her favourite book.

== Film, TV and theatrical adaptations ==
In 1971, the novel was adapted for television as Sunset Song, with Vivien Heilbron in the role of Chris Guthrie.

There are also a number of adaptations for the stage. The adaptation by Alastair Cording was produced by Aberdeen Performing Arts at His Majesty's Theatre under the direction of Kenny Ireland in 2008. It was staged again on the Edinburgh Festival Fringe in 2010. An adaptation by Morna Young was staged at Dundee Rep and the Lyceum Theatre, Edinburgh under the direction of Finn den Hertog, between April and June 2024.

Jack Webster, the Scottish writer and journalist, wrote a play based on the novel and Lewis Grassic Gibbon's life which toured Scotland in 2008. The novel was also the inspiration for the Richard Thompson song "Poor Ditching Boy" on his 1972 album Henry the Human Fly.

In 2015, English filmmaker Terence Davies and producer Bob Last released an adaptation of the book, titled Sunset Song, starring Agyness Deyn and Peter Mullan.
