= Sunset Song (film) =

2015 film

- Film poster
- Directed by: Terence Davies
- Screenplay by: Terence Davies
- Based on: Sunset Song by Lewis Grassic Gibbon
- Produced by: Sol Papadopolous; Roy Boulter; Nicolas Steil
- Starring: Agyness Deyn; Peter Mullan; Kevin Guthrie
- Cinematography: Michael McDonough
- Edited by: David Charap
- Music by: Gast Waltzing
- Release dates: 13 September 2015 (TIFF); 4 December 2015 (United Kingdom)
- Running time: 135 minutes
- Countries: United Kingdom; Luxembourg
- Languages: English; Scots

Sunset Song is a 2015 British drama film written and directed by Terence Davies and starring Agyness Deyn, Peter Mullan and Kevin Guthrie. It is an adaptation of Lewis Grassic Gibbon's 1932 novel of the same name. It was shown in the Special Presentations section of the 2015 Toronto International Film Festival and was released in the United Kingdom on 4 December 2015. The film follows Chris Guthrie, the daughter of a Scottish farmer in the early 1900s.

== Plot ==
Chris Guthrie, the daughter of an Aberdeenshire farmer, is a sensitive writer and extremely good at school, particularly in languages. She lives with her domineering and abusive father, her warm and kind mother, her brother, and two younger siblings. After her father rapes her mother, resulting in the birth of twins, the family moves to a larger home in Kindraddie. While there Chris begins to study at college to become a teacher.

One day Chris's mother warns her of the horror of being raped and shortly after commits suicide, poisoning both herself and her twin newborns. Chris quits her studies and she and her brother commit to helping their father on the farm, while their two younger siblings go to live with their childless aunt and uncle. Chris's brother Will warns her not to let her father run her down the way he did with their mother and tells her his hope of running off to Canada.

Will does eventually leave for Aberdeen instead, though not before briefly introducing her to his friend, fellow farmer Ewan Tavendale.

Chris's father, John, eventually suffers a debilitating stroke putting the care of the farm entirely on Chris, especially after she learns that her brother has married and sailed for Argentina with his new bride. He also tries to rape Chris, though because of his physical condition he is unable to. He dies shortly afterwards leaving all his property and money to Chris. Rather than sell off his possessions she decides to stay on the farm. Very quickly afterwards she and Ewan fall in love and decide to get married and Chris is relieved that she will be able to stay in Kindraddie.

Chris and Ewan have a loving marriage and she gives birth to a son, Ewan Jr, just as the start of World War I. Ewan at first refuses to enlist, but knowing that conscription will soon be passed he eventually decides to go to war. Ewan comes back on leave a changed man. Violent and abrasive he rapes Chris and the two part on bad terms. Chris eventually receives mail informing her that Ewan is dead. She learns from her friend Chae that Ewan was executed as a deserter because he tried to return home to see Chris, devastated that he never got to kiss her goodbye the last time he saw her.

== Cast ==
- Agyness Deyn as Chris Guthrie
- Peter Mullan as John Guthrie, father of Chris
- Kevin Guthrie as Ewan Tavendale
- Jack Greenlees as Will Guthrie
- Daniela Nardini as Jena Guthrie
- Ian Pirie as Chae Strachan
- Douglas Rankine as Long Rob
- Mark Bonnar as Reverend Gibbon
- Simon Tait as Dr. Meldrum
- Trish Mullin as Mistress Melon
- Julian Nest as Mr. Semple, lawyer
- Linda Duncan McLaughlin as Auntie Janet
- Ron Donachie as Uncle Tam
- Jamie Michie as Mr. Kinloch
- Niall Greig Fulton as John Brigson
- Jim Sweeney as Preacher
- Hugh Ross as School Inspector
- David Ganly as Tinker
- Tom Duncan as McIvor
- Ken Blackburn as Galt

== Production ==
The film features Peter Mullan and Kevin Guthrie, and was shot in New Zealand, Luxembourg and Scotland. It was produced by Iris Productions, SellOut Pictures and Hurricane Films and backed by BFI, Creative Scotland, BBC Scotland and Luxembourg Film Fund.
