= Lewis Grassic Gibbon =

Scottish writer (1901–1935)

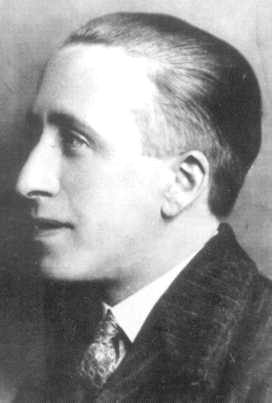
- Born: James Leslie Mitchell; 13 February 1901; Hillhead of Seggat, Auchterless, Aberdeenshire, Scotland
- Died: 7 February 1935 (aged 33); Welwyn Garden City, Hertfordshire, England
- Occupation: Novelist
- Children: Rhea Martin
- Writing career
- Pen name: Lewis Grassic Gibbon
- Period: 1928–1935
- Genre: General fiction
- Subjects: Scottish country life Science fiction Historical novels
- Notable works: The trilogy A Scots Quair, in particular the first book Sunset Song
- Literary movement: 20th-century Scottish Renaissance
- Website: www.grassicgibbon.com

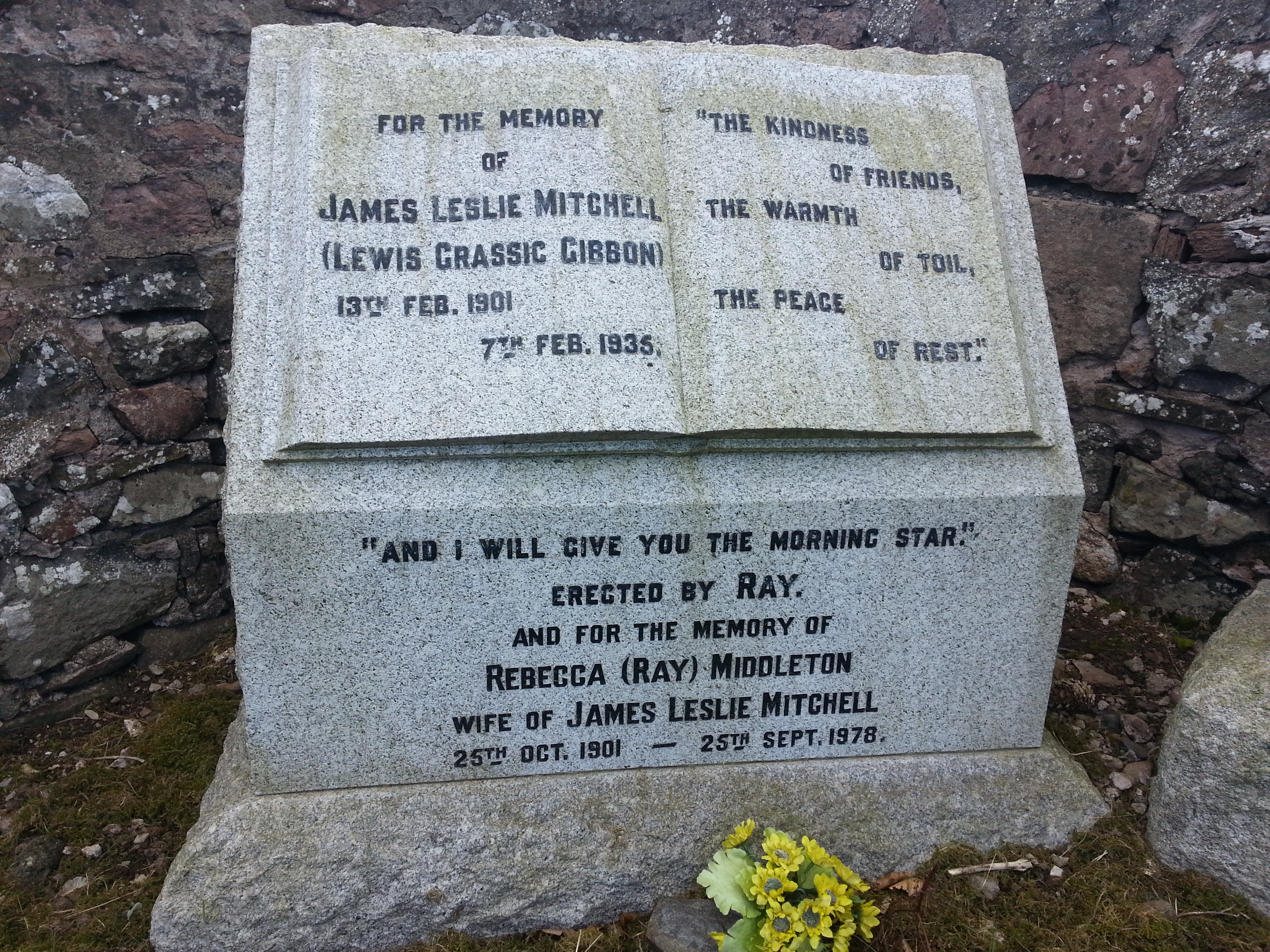
Memorial to Lewis Grassic Gibbon in Arbuthnott kirkyard

James Leslie Mitchell (13 February 1901 – 7 February 1935), known by the pseudonym Lewis Grassic Gibbon (Scots pronunciation: [ˈluːɪs ˈɡrasɪk ˈɡɪbən]), was a Scottish writer. He was best known for A Scots Quair, a trilogy set in the north-east of Scotland in the early 20th century, of which all three parts have been serialised on BBC television.

== Personal life ==
Mitchell was born into a farming family in Auchterless and raised from the age of seven in Arbuthnott, in the former county of Kincardineshire. He was educated first at the parish school and then at Mackie Academy in Stonehaven. Mitchell started working as a journalist for the Aberdeen Journal in 1917 and later for the Farmers Weekly after moving to Glasgow. During that time he was active with the British Socialist Party.

In 1919, Mitchell joined the Royal Army Service Corps and served in Iran, India and Egypt before enlisting in the Royal Air Force in 1923. In the RAF he worked as a clerk and spent some time in the Middle East.

When he married Rebecca Middleton (known as Ray) in 1925, they settled in Welwyn Garden City. He began writing full time in 1929, producing numerous books and shorter works under his real name and his pseudonym. He suffered an early death in 1935 from peritonitis, brought on by a perforated ulcer.

Mitchell's body was cremated at Golders Green Crematorium on 11 February 1935. Literary figures who attended the ceremony included Edwin Muir, James Barke, Donald Carswell, John Malcolm Bulloch and the Scots language poet Jean Baxter. When his ashes were interred at the cemetery in Arbuthnott on 23 February, the Scottish literary community was represented by Nan Shepherd, Helen Cruickshank and Eric Linklater.

== Fiction ==
Mitchell gained attention from his earliest attempts at fiction, notably from H. G. Wells, but it was his trilogy entitled A Scots Quair, and in particular its first book Sunset Song, with which he made his mark. A Scots Quair, with its combination of stream-of-consciousness, lyrical use of dialect, and social realism, is considered to be among the defining works of the 20th century Scottish Renaissance. It tells the story of Chris Guthrie, a young woman growing up in the north-east of Scotland in the early 20th century. All three parts of the trilogy have been turned into serials by BBC Scotland, written by Bill Craig, with Vivien Heilbron as Chris. Sunset Song was also adapted into a film in 2015. Spartacus, a novel set in the famous slave revolt, is his best-known full-length work outside this trilogy.

In 1932 he used the pseudonym Lewis Grassic Gibbon for the first time when 'Sunset Song' was published in August of that year. The name, Lewis Grassic Gibbon, is a variation of his maternal grandmother's name Lilias Grassick Gibbon.

In 1934 Mitchell collaborated with Hugh MacDiarmid on Scottish Scene, which included three of Gibbon's short stories. His stories were collected posthumously in A Scots Hairst (1969). Possibly his best-known is "Smeddum", a Scots word which could be best translated as the colloquial term "guts". Like A Scots Quair, it is set in north-east Scotland with strong female characters. In 1976 the BBC produced a Play for Today, Clay, Smeddum and Greenden, a dramatisation of three of his short stories by Bill Craig. Also notable is his essay The Land.

== Remembrance ==
The Grassic Gibbon Centre, attached to the local village hall, was established in Arbuthnott in 1991 to commemorate the author's life. Within it is a small museum about his life and work, as well as a café. There is a memorial to him and his wife, and other members of the Mitchell family, in the western corner of the village churchyard (parish church of Saint Ternan) of Arbuthnott Church, nowadays in Aberdeenshire.

In 2016 Sunset Song was voted Scotland's favourite novel in the BBC Love to Read campaign. A feature article on the novel has been written by Nicola Sturgeon, who edited a recent edition.

== Bibliography ==
Lewis Grassic Gibbon published 17 books during his life, as well as one published posthumously. 11 of them were printed under his real name of James Leslie Mitchell. Five were published under his pseudonym, Lewis Grassic Gibbon, with his final work published while he was alive, was published under both names.

- Hanno: or the Future of Exploration (1928)
- Stained Radiance: A Fictionist's Prelude (1930)
- The Thirteenth Disciple (1931)
- The Calends of Cairo (1931)
- Three Go Back (1932)
- The Lost Trumpet (1932)
- Sunset Song (1932), the first book of the trilogy A Scots Quair - The first book under the pseudonym Lewis Grassic Gibbon.
- Persian Dawns, Egyptian Nights (1932)
- Image and Superscription (1933)
- Cloud Howe (1933), the second book of the trilogy A Scots Quair - under the name Lewis Grassic Gibbon
- Spartacus (1933)
- Niger: The Life of Mungo Park (1934) - under the name Lewis Grassic Gibbon
- The Conquest of the Maya (1934)
- Gay Hunter (1934)
- Scottish Scene (1934), with Hugh MacDiarmid (also titled The Intelligent Man's Guide to Albyn) - under the name Lewis Grassic Gibbon
- Grey Granite (1934), the third book of the trilogy A Scots Quair - under the name Lewis Grassic Gibbon
- Nine Against the Unknown: A Record of Geographical Exploration (1934) - Published under both names of Lewis Grassic Gibbon and James Leslie Mitchell.

=== Posthumous works ===
These works were all published under the name Lewis Grassic Gibbon.

- A Scots Quair, A Trilogy of Novels: Sunset Song, Cloud Howe and Grey Granite (1946) - LGG
- A Scots Hairst, Essays and Short Stories (1967)
- Smeddum: Stories and Essays (1980)
- The Speak of the Mearns (1982)
- Smeddum: A Lewis Grassic Gibbon Anthology (2001)

== Adaptations ==
- Clay, Smeddum and Greenden, a 1976 Play for Today adapting three of his short stories, dramatised by Bill Craig and directed by Moira Armstrong.
- Sunset Song (2015) written and directed by Terence Davies, starring Agyness Deyn, Peter Mullan and Kevin Guthrie

== Reviews ==
Glenda Norquay, "Echoes from The Mearns", reviewing The Speak of the Mearns, in Sheila G. Hearn, ed., Cencrastus No. 13, Summer 1983, pp. 54–55
