= Sunset Song (TV series) =

1971 British television series

Sunset Song is a 1971 BBC Scotland adaptation of Lewis Grassic Gibbon's novel of the same name for television.

It consists of six episodes of around 45 minutes each. The series was the first colour drama made by BBC Scotland, and also contained the first nude scene. The series made the important change from the novel of turning Chris Guthrie, the main character, into the narrator. It was shown in the USA on Masterpiece Theatre in 1975–76. The composer Thomas Wilson was commissioned to write the theme music, which the BBC retained for the remaining two parts of the trilogy A Scots Quair, commissioning Wilson again to compose the incidental music for the remaining productions of Cloud Howe and Grey Granite.

Chris Guthrie was played by Vivien Heilbron. The cast included several other leading Scottish actors of the time, including Andrew Keir, Edith MacArthur, Anne Kristen, Roddy McMillan, Alex McAvoy and John Grieve. The script was by Bill Craig, and it was directed by Moira Armstrong.

The serial was repeated on BBC Four in September 2022 and January 2025. As of November 2025 it is available for 11 months on BBC iPlayer, along with a short introduction filmed in 2022 where Heilbron and Armstrong discuss the serial.
