= Vivien Heilbron =

Scottish actress (born 1944)

- Born: 13 May 1944 (age 82); Glasgow, Scotland
- Occupation: Actress • LAMDA Examiner
- Spouses: Jonathan Cecil (m. 1963; div. 1975); David Rintoul (m. 2008)
- Relatives: Lorna Heilbron (sister)

Vivien Heilbron (born 13 May 1944) is a Scottish actress.

== Career ==
Heilbron, who was born in Glasgow, Scotland, was a member of the company at Dundee Repertory Theatre in the mid-1960s. She achieved fame in her homeland when she appeared in the 1971 BBC Scotland television series Sunset Song, an adaptation of Lewis Grassic Gibbon's novel, in the lead role of Chris Guthrie. "The television programme was quite instrumental in raising Gibbon's publicity," she said. "It put him on the school curriculum where he had not been before."

In the early 1980s, she appeared in its two sequels, Cloud Howe and Grey Granite (the trilogy is known as A Scots Quair).

=== Other television ===
From the first episode in 1980, she played district nurse Kay Grant in the Scottish Television soap opera Take the High Road.

In 1972, she starred in The Moonstone, a BBC adaptation of the Wilkie Collins novel for which she was nominated for a Primetime Emmy Award for "Outstanding Continued Performance by an Actress in a Leading Role". She appeared as Emm in Ace of Wands and as regular Det. Sgt. Louise Colbert in the BBC detective series Target. She received an Emmy nomination for her performance in The Moonstone. She appeared as a minor character, Christine Pretis, in EastEnders from 1989 to 1992.

Other television appearances include Lord Peter Wimsey; one episode of The Unpleasantness at the Bellona Club; Hetty Wainthropp Investigates; Taggart; The New Statesman; and Agatha Christie's Poirot.

=== Film ===
On film, she played Catriona opposite Michael Caine in the 1971 film version of Robert Louis Stevenson's Kidnapped, also appeared in Mysteries (1978), starring Rutger Hauer and Sylvia Kristel and the 1998 comedy The Sea Change, with Ray Winstone.

=== Theatre ===
On stage, she has played Elizabeth in Richard III opposite Derek Jacobi, and Blanche DuBois in A Streetcar Named Desire at the Royal Lyceum Theatre in Edinburgh. She more recently returned in An Evening With Grassic Gibbon, playing The Narrator.

Year	Title	Role	Company	Director	Notes
1988	Holy Isle	Margause, Queen of Orkney	Brunton Theatre Company	Charles Nowosielski	Edinburgh International Festival production of the play by James Bridie

== Personal life ==
Heilbron met actor Jonathan Cecil when they were both studying at the London Academy of Music and Dramatic Art, and the couple married in 1963. Heilbron married actor David Rintoul in 2008. She is the elder sister of actress Lorna Heilbron and the sister-in-law of Nicholas Clay.
